= Council of Bishops of the Serbian Orthodox Church =

Supreme body of the Serbian Orthodox Church

The Council of Bishops of the Serbian Orthodox Church (Serbian: Архијерејски сабор Српске православне цркве, romanized: Arhijerejski sabor Srpske pravoslavne crkve), officially known as the Holy Council of Bishops of the Serbian Orthodox Church (Serbian: Свети архијерејски сабор Српске православне цркве, romanized: Sveti arhijerejski sabor Srpske pravoslavne crkve), is the supreme body of the Serbian Orthodox Church. It is convened annually in May, though extraordinary sessions may also be called when necessary.

== Powers ==
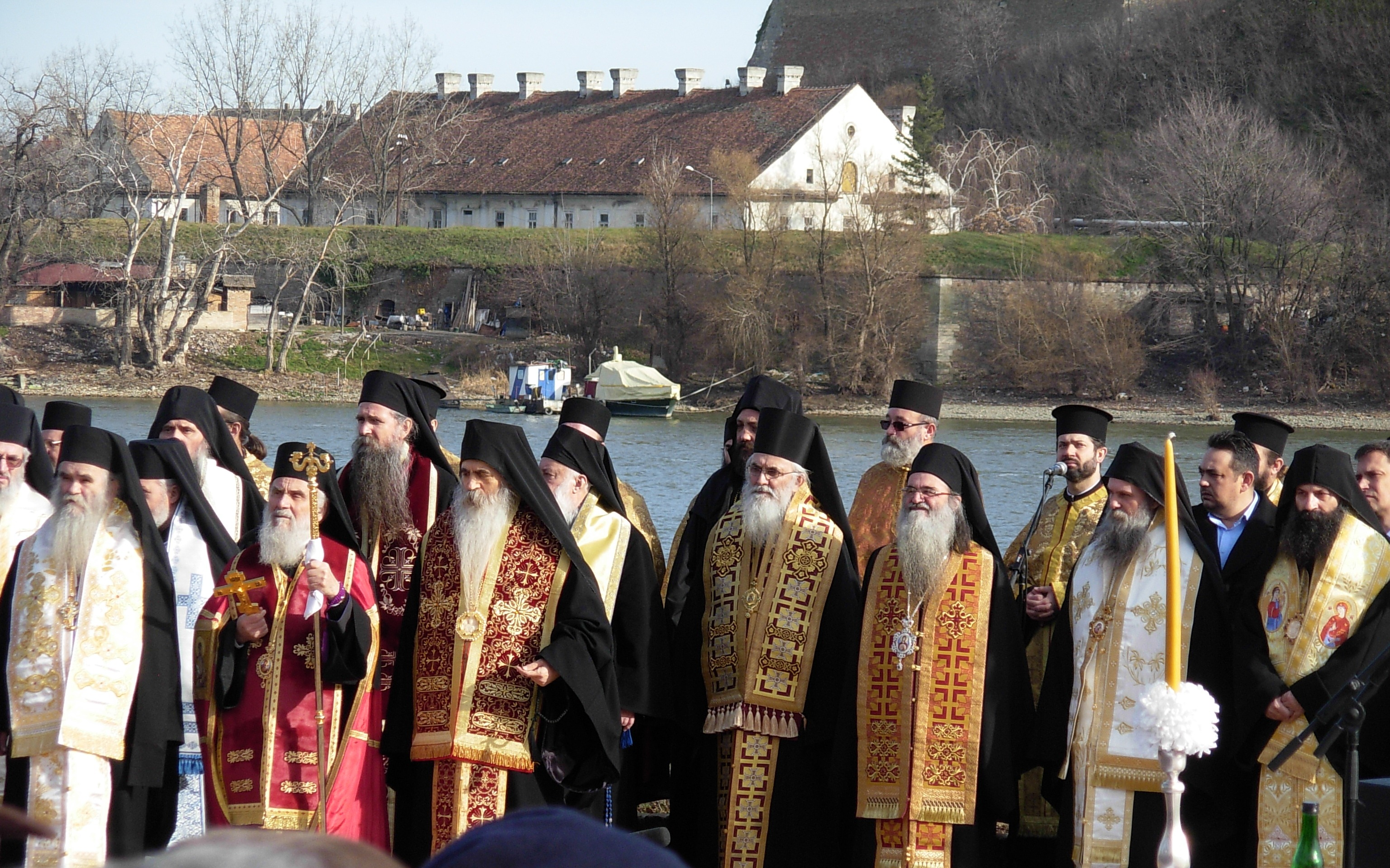
Bishops attending the 70th anniversary of the Novi Sad raid, 2012

According to the Constitution of the Serbian Orthodox Church, the Council of Bishops:

- interprets Eastern Orthodox doctrine in accordance with Holy Scripture and Sacred tradition as well as canonical rules and regulations;
- regulates the internal and external mission of the Church for the preservation and promotion of the Eastern Orthodox faith and Christian morality;
- canonizes saints and prescribes liturgical services for their veneration;
- elects Patriarch;
- elects metropolitan bishops, diocesan bishops, and vicar bishops;
- decides on the territorial organization of the Church, including the establishment and division of dioceses and vicariates;
- determines disciplinary regulations for the clergy, including ecclesiastical judicial matters;
- acts as the supreme ecclesiastical judicial body, adjudicating major disputes and appeals, including cases involving bishops and the patriarch;
- establishes theological schools and seminaries;
- establishes monasteries;
- establishes charitable organizations.

== Composition ==
The Council of Bishops consists of all diocesan bishops and the Patriarch, who serves as the chairman. Decisions are valid if adopted in the presence of more than half of the diocesan bishops. In the event of a tied vote, the Patriarch casts the deciding vote.

Patriarch	Archdiocese
Porfirije	Belgrade and Karlovci (Note: The Archdiocese of Belgrade and Karlovci has jurisdiction over the city of Belgrade, the capital of Serbia. The title Karlovci is a reference to the former Metropolitanate of Karlovci. This diocese is headed by the Serbian Patriarch.)
Metropolitan bishop	Metropolitanate
Hrizostom Jević	Dabar and Bosnia
Joanikije Mićović	Montenegro and the Littoral
vacant since 2021 (Note: Administered by Bishop Kirilo Bojović of Buenos Aires, South and Central America.)	Zagreb and Ljubljana
Siluan Mrakić	Australia and New Zealand
Bishop	Eparchy
Andrej Ćilerdžić	Austria
Irinej Bulović	Bačka
Nikanor Bogunović (sr)	Banat
Jefrem Milutinović	Banja Luka
Sergije Karanović (sr)	Bihać and Petrovac
Ignatije Midić	Braničevo
Dositej Motika (sr)	Scandinavia
Lukijan Pantelić (sr)	Buda
Metodije Ostojić	Budimlja and Nikšić
Kirilo Bojović	Buenos Aires, South America, and Central America
Mitrofan Kodić	Canada
Nikodim Kosović (sr)	Dalmatia
Grigorije Durić	Düsseldorf and Germany
Irinej Dobrijević	Eastern America
David Perović (sr)	Kruševac
Atanasije Rakita (sr)	Mileševa
Longin Krčo	New Gračanica and Midwestern America
Arsenije Glavčić	Niš
Heruvim Đermanović (sr)	Osijek Plain and Baranya
Teodosije Šibalić	Raška and Prizren
Jovan Ćulibrk	Slavonia
Vasilije Vadić (sr)	Srem
Jerotej Petrović (sr)	Šabac
Jovan Mladenović (sr)	Šumadija
vacant since 1932 (Note: Administered by Bishop Lukijan Pantelić of Buda.)	Timișoara
Ilarion Golubović (sr)	Timok
Gerasim Popović (sr)	Gornji Karlovac
Isihije Rogić (sr)	Valjevo
Pahomije Gačić (sr)	Vranje
Maksim Vasiljević	Western America
Justin Jeremić (sr)	Western Europe
Dimitrije Rađenović (sr)	Zachlumia, Herzegovina, and the Littoral
Fotije Sladojević (sr)	Zvornik and Tuzla
Justin Stefanović (sr)	Žiča
Titular bishop	Vicariate
vacant since 2021	Duklja
Jovan Stanojević (sr)	Hum
Aleksej Bogićević (sr)	Hvosno
Nektarije Samardžić (sr)	Eger
Dositej Radivojević (sr)	Lipljan
Sava Bundalo (sr)	Marča
Damaskin Grabež (sr)	Mohač
Antonije Pantelić (sr)	Moravica
Ilarion Lupulović (sr)	Novo Brdo
Stefan Šarić (sr)	Remesiana
Petar Bogdanović (sr)	Toplica

== See also ==
- Holy Synod of the Serbian Orthodox Church
