= Eparchies and metropolitanates of the Serbian Orthodox Church =

Subdivisions of the Serbian Orthodox Church

This is the list of eparchies (dioceses) and metropolitanates (metropolitan dioceses) of the Serbian Orthodox Church, according to the Constitution of the Serbian Orthodox Church and subsequent decisions of the Council of Bishops of the Serbian Orthodox Church.

== Canonical territory ==
The canonical territory of the Serbian Orthodox Church, which encompasses Serbia, Bosnia and Herzegovina, Montenegro, Kosovo, Croatia, and Slovenia, is divided into one archdiocese, 3 metropolitanates, and 25 eparchies.

Canonical territory of the Serbian Orthodox Church

Archdiocese	Seat	Cathedral	Founded	Archbishop
Belgrade and Karlovci (Note: The Archdiocese of Belgrade and Karlovci has jurisdiction over the city of Belgrade, the capital of Serbia. The title Karlovci is a reference to the former Metropolitanate of Karlovci.)	(Serbia) Belgrade	Cathedral of Saint Archangel Michael, Belgrade	1931	Porfirije (Note: The Archdiocese of Belgrade and Karlovci is traditionally headed by the Serbian Patriarch.)
Metropolitanate	Seat	Cathedral	Founded	Metropolitan bishop
Dabar and Bosnia	(Bosnia and Herzegovina) Sarajevo	Cathedral of the Nativity of the Theotokos, Sarajevo	1219	Hrizostom Jević
Montenegro and the Littoral	(Montenegro) Cetinje	Cathedral of the Resurrection of Christ, Podgorica	1219	Joanikije Mićović
Zagreb and Ljubljana	(Croatia) Zagreb	Cathedral of the Transfiguration of the Lord, Zagreb	1931	Kirilo Bojović (administrator)
Eparchy	Seat	Cathedral	Founded	Bishop
Bačka	(Serbia) Novi Sad	Saint George Cathedral, Novi Sad	16th century (re-est. 1932)	Irinej Bulović
Banat	(Serbia) Vršac	Saint Nicholas Cathedral, Vršac	16th century (re-est. 1932)	Nikanor Bogunović
Banja Luka	(Bosnia and Herzegovina) Banja Luka	Cathedral of Christ the Saviour, Banja Luka	1900	Jefrem Milutinović
Bihać and Petrovac	(Bosnia and Herzegovina) Bosanski Petrovac	Saints Peter and Paul Cathedral, Bosanski Petrovac	1925 (re-est. 1990)	Sergije Karanović
Braničevo	(Serbia) Požarevac	Cathedral of Archangels Michael and Gabriel, Požarevac	1921	Ignatije Midić
Buda (Note: The Eparchy of Buda, whose jurisdiction is limited to ethnic Serbs in Hungary, is regarded as part of the traditional jurisdiction of the Serbian Orthodox Church, but stricto sensu it is not within its canonical territory.)	(Hungary) Szentendre	Cathedral of the Dormition of the Theotokos, Szentendre	1740s	Lukijan Pantelić
Budimlja and Nikšić	(Montenegro) Berane	Saint Basil of Ostrog Cathedral, Nikšić	1219 (re-est. 1932)	Metodije Ostojić
Dalmatia	(Croatia) Krka	Cathedral of the Dormition of the Theotokos, Šibenik	1692	Nikodim Kosović
Gornji Karlovac	(Croatia) Karlovac	Saint Nicholas Cathedral, Karlovac	1695	Gerasim Popović
Kruševac	(Serbia) Kruševac	Saint George Cathedral, Kruševac	2010	David Perović
Mileševa	(Serbia) Prijepolje	Saint Basil of Ostrog Cathedral, Prijepolje	1992	Atanasije Rakita
Niš	(Serbia) Niš	Holy Trinity Cathedral, Niš	1878	Arsenije Glavčić
Osijek Plain and Baranya	(Croatia) Dalj	Saint Demetrius Cathedral, Dalj	1991	Heruvim Đermanović
Raška and Prizren	(Kosovo) Gračanica	Saint George Cathedral, Prizren	1808	Teodosije Šibalić
Slavonia	(Croatia) Jasenovac	Holy Trinity Cathedral, Pakrac	1557	Jovan Ćulibrk
Srem	(Serbia) Sremski Karlovci	Saint Nicholas Cathedral, Sremski Karlovci	1500	Vasilije Vadić
Šabac	(Serbia) Šabac	Saints Peter and Paul Cathedral, Šabac	2006	Jerotej Petrović
Šumadija	(Serbia) Kragujevac	Cathedral of the Dormition of the Theotokos, Kragujevac	1947	Jovan Mladenović
Timișoara (Note: The Eparchy of Timișoara, whose jurisdiction is limited to ethnic Serbs in Romania, is regarded as part of the traditional jurisdiction of the Serbian Orthodox Church, but stricto sensu it is not within its canonical territory.)	(Romania) Timișoara	Cathedral of the Ascension of the Lord, Timișoara	1608	Lukijan Pantelić (administrator)
Timok	(Serbia) Zaječar	Cathedral of Nativity of the Theotokos, Zaječar	1833	Ilarion Golubović
Valjevo	(Serbia) Valjevo	Cathedral of the Resurrection of the Lord, Valjevo	2006	Isihije Rogić
Vranje	(Serbia) Vranje	Holy Trinity Cathedral, Vranje	1975	Pahomije Gačić
Zachlumia, Herzegovina, and the Littoral	(Bosnia and Herzegovina) Trebinje	Cathedral of the Transfiguration of the Lord, Trebinje	1219	Dimitrije Rađenović
Zvornik and Tuzla	(Bosnia and Herzegovina) Bijeljina	Cathedral of the Dormition of the Theotokos, Tuzla	1532	Fotije Sladojević
Žiča	(Serbia) Kraljevo	Cathedral of the Holy Trinity, Kraljevo	1219	Justin Stefanović

== Diaspora ==
Outside its canonical territory, the Serbian Orthodox Church maintains one metropolitanate and 11 eparchies serving the Serb diaspora in Europe, the Americas, and Australia.

Eparchies in Europe (left) and North America (right)

Metropolitanate	Seat	Cathedral	Founded	Metropolitan bishop
Australia and New Zealand	(Australia) Sydney	Saint George Cathedral, Cabramatta	1964	Siluan Mrakić
Eparchy	Seat	Cathedral	Founded	Bishop
Austria	(Austria) Vienna	Saint Sava Cathedral, Vienna	2011	Irinej Bulović (administrator)
Britain and Ireland	(United Kingdom) London	Saint Sava Cathedral, London	2024	Nektarije Samardžić
Buenos Aires, South America, and Central America	(Argentina) Buenos Aires	Cathedral of the Nativity of the Theotokos, Buenos Aires	2011	Kirilo Bojović
Canada	(Canada) Milton	Saint Nicholas Cathedral, Hamilton	1983	Mitrofan Kodić
Düsseldorf and Germany	(Germany) Düsseldorf	Saint Sava Cathedral, Düsseldorf	1990	Grigorije Durić
Eastern America	(United States) New Rochelle	Holy Trinity Cathedral, Pittsburgh	1963	Irinej Dobrijević
New Gračanica and Midwestern America	(United States) Third Lake	Cathedral of the Holy Resurrection, Chicago	1963	Longin Krčo
Scandinavia	(Sweden) Stockholm	Saint Sava Cathedral, Stockholm	1990	Dositej Motika
Switzerland	(Switzerland) Zurich	Holy Trinity Cathedral, Zurich	2024	Andrej Ćilerdžić
Western America	(United States) Alhambra	Saint Steven Cathedral, Alhambra	1963	Maksim Vasiljević
Western Europe	(France) Paris	Saint Sava Cathedral, Paris	1994	Justin Jeremić

== See also ==
- Eparchies and metropolitanates of the Russian Orthodox Church
- Eparchies and metropolitanates of the Romanian Orthodox Church
- Eparchies of the Georgian Orthodox Church
