= Joanikije Mićović =

Metropolitan of Montenegro

His Grace, Primate Joanikije II
- Metropolitan of Montenegro and the Littoral
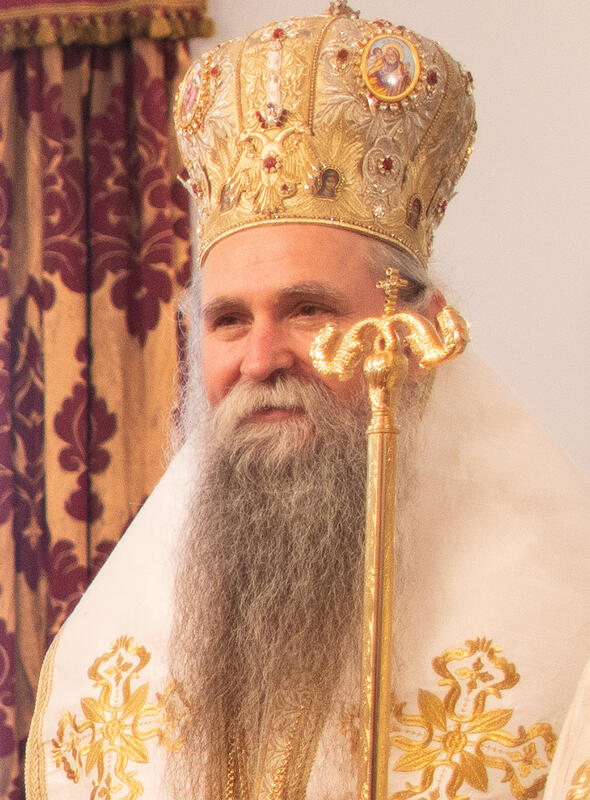
- Joanikije in May 2019.
- Native name: Јоаникије II
- Church: Serbian Orthodox Church
- Diocese: Metropolitanate of Montenegro and the Littoral
- Elected: 29 May 2021
- Installed: 5 September 2021 (Note: Served as the administrator of the Metropolitanate from 30 October 2020)
- Predecessor: Amfilohije
- Previous posts: Eparchy of Budimlja and Nikšić (1999–2021)

Orders
- Ordination: 30 October 1990 by Amfilohije (Radović)
- Consecration: 13 June 1999 by Serbian Patriarch Pavle
- Rank: Metropolitan, Archbishop

Personal details
- Born: Jovan Mićović; 20 April 1959 (age 67) Velimlje, PR Montenegro, FPR Yugoslavia (now Montenegro)
- Denomination: Eastern Orthodoxy
- Residence: Cetinje, Montenegro (1990–1999, 2021–present); Berane, Montenegro (1999–2021)
- Education: University of Belgrade

Joanikije II (Serbian Cyrillic: Јоаникије, secular name Jovan Mićović, Serbian Cyrillic: Јован Мићовић; English: Joannicius II; born 20 April 1959) is a Serbian Orthodox metropolitan bishop serving as the Metropolitan of Montenegro and the Littoral and the primate of the Serbian Orthodox Church in Montenegro since May 2021, previously he served as the administrator of the same diocese from October 2020, and death of his predecessor Amfilohije (Radović). Bishop Joanikije was the head of the Eparchy of Budimlja and Nikšić from 2002 until 2021 and titular bishop of Budimlja betweein 1999 and 2002.

== Early life and education ==
He was born on 20 April 1959 into the Banjani tribe in the village of Velimlje near the city of Nikšić. Through his maternal family he is related to Arsenije IV Jovanović Šakabenta. He finished his secondary education at the Nikšić Gymnasium. He graduated from the University of Belgrade Faculty of Orthodox Theology in 1990 and he finished his advanced studies at the University of Belgrade Faculty of Philosophy. He was ordained a monk in the Ćelija Piperska Monastery on 30 October 1990. He was ordained a hierodeacon on 7 February 1991 and a hieromonk on 17 February 1991, taking the role of caretaker head of the Savina Monastery. On 1 September 1991 he became the head of the Cetinje Monastery and a teacher and main instructor in the re-formed Cetinje Seminary. In September 1995, he was promoted to the rank of protosyncellus and he was placed as the caretaker rector of the Cetinje Seminary.

== Bishop of Budimlja and Nikšić ==
During its regular session in May 1999, the Bishops' Council of the Serbian Orthodox Church chose him the titular bishop of Budimlja and the vicar of the Metropolitanate of Montenegro and the Littoral. On 3 June 1999, he was consecrated a bishop in the Cetinje Monastery by Patriarch Pavle with Metropolitan of Montenegro Amfilohije and twelve other bishops serving. On the recommendation of Amfilohije, the Bishops' Council during its regular session in May 2000 re-established the old Eparchy of Budimlja and Nikšić. Joanikije was then elevated to the post of the diocesan bishop of Budimlja and Nikšić in 2002. Joanikije was a member of the Holy Synod of the Serbian Orthodox Church from 2004 to 2006.

In December 2019, Bishop Joanikije survived an assassination attempt in Belgrade, Serbia, while he was in a meeting with Montenegrin-Serbian businessman and Church benefactor Miodrag Davidović.

On 12 May 2020, in the course of the mass manifestations against the proposed "Law on Freedom of Religion or Belief and the Legal Status of Religious Communities", Bishop Joanikije was arrested by Montenegrin police for leading a religious procession marking the day of Saint Basil of Ostrog. On 16 May 2020, Bishop Joanikije and eight priests of the Orthodox Cathedral of St. Basil of Ostrog in Nikšić were released at around midnight after 72 hours spent in detention.

== Metropolitan of Montenegro (since 2020) ==
On 30 October 2020, after the death of Amfilohije, Metropolitan of Montenegro, due to complications caused by the COVID-19 infection, bishop Joanikije was selected temporary administrator of the Metropolitanate by the church council, until the election of a new head of the Serbian Orthodox Church in Montenegro. On 1 November, Joanikije was one of speakers at the funeral of Metropolitan Amfilohije, in the Cathedral of the Resurrection of Christ in Podgorica, along with Serbian Patriarch Irinej, notable poet and Amfilohije's close friend Matija Bećković and Prime Minister of Montenegro, Zdravko Krivokapić.

On 3 November 2020 Joanikije tested positive to COVID-19. His health had improved in the meantime, and on 28 November, the results of the tests performed showed that he was negative for COVID-19.

On 29 May 2021, the Bishops' Council convened in the Belgrade Church of Saint Sava formally elected bishop Joanikije Metropolitan of Montenegro and the Littoral, with the seat in Cetinje Monastery.

On 5 September 2021, he was enthroned in the Cetinje Monastery by Patriarch Porfirije. The decision to hold the ceremony at a historic monastery in the town of Cetinje, the country′s former capital, further exacerbated political and ethnic tensions in Montenegro. Violent protests had begun the day prior with predominantly Montenegrin nationalist protesters setting up barricades at the town′s entrance in order to prevent the Patriarch and Metropolitan from reaching the monastery. Both the Metropolitan and the Patriarch were flown to Cetinje by helicopter and then led into the monastery by heavily armed riot police holding bulletproof vests over their bodies to protect them, as riot police used tear gas to disperse protesters who hurled rocks and bottles at them and fired guns into the air. No fewer than 20 people were injured and police arrested more than a dozen people, including the security advisor to president Milo Đukanović, Veselin Veljović. Đukanović, who had recommended that the inauguration of Joanikije be held elsewhere and encouraged the protesters to disrupt the ceremony, stated that "Today we witnessed the embarrassment of both the Church and the government", while prime minister Zdravko Krivokapić called the violence an "attempted act of terrorism".

== Notes ==
Serbian Orthodox Church titles
Preceded by Amfilohije Radović	Metropolitan of Montenegro and the Littoral; 2021 – present	Incumbent
New diocese	Bishop of Budimlja and Nikšić; 2002 – 2021	Succeeded by Metodije Ostojić
