= Holy Synod of the Serbian Orthodox Church =

Governing body of the Serbian Orthodox Church

The Holy Synod of the Serbian Orthodox Church (Serbian: Свети синод Српске православне цркве, romanized: Sveti sinod Srpske pravoslavne crkve), officially known as the Holy Synod of Bishops of the Serbian Orthodox Church (Serbian: Свети архијерејски синод Српске православне цркве, romanized: Sveti arhijerejski sinod Srpske pravoslavne crkve), is the governing body of the Serbian Orthodox Church.

== Powers ==
According to the Constitution of the Serbian Orthodox Church, the Holy Synod:

- maintains the dogmatic and canonical unity of the Church and its relations with other autocephal Eastern Orthodox churches;
- preserves the purity of Eastern Orthodox doctrine, suppressing heresy, superstition, and practices considered contrary to Church teachings;
- oversees liturgical life, including the uniform performance of worship, publication of service books, and administration of the Holy Sacraments;
- directs the internal and external mission of the Church and preserve and promotes the spread of the Eastern Orthodox faith and Christian morality;
- manages administrative and financial affairs of the Church, including church funds, endowments, and official publications;
- exercises judicial authority in ecclesiastical matters, including disputes between bishops and canonical or disciplinary offenses;
- supervises the work of bishops and administers vacant dioceses;
- prepares the agenda for the Council of Bishops and implements its decisions;
- supervises theological schools and seminaries;
- supervises monasteries;
- supervises church art, iconography, relics, church monuments, and other ecclesiastical heritage.

== Composition ==
The Holy Synod consists of five members: four bishops and the Patriarch who serves as the chairman. They are elected by the Council of Bishops for two-year terms, with two members elected each year. Sessions of the Holy Synod are held either in a narrow composition, consisting of the Patriarch and two members, or in a full composition comprising all members of the Synod.

Portrait	Name	Title	Serving since
	Porfirije (Chairman)	Archbishop of Peć, Metropolitan bishop of Belgrade and Karlovci, (Note: The Archdiocese of Belgrade and Karlovci has jurisdiction over the city of Belgrade, the capital of Serbia. The title Karlovci is a reference to the former Metropolitanate of Karlovci. This diocese is headed by the Serbian Patriarch.) and Serbian Patriarch	2021; Previously: 2017–2019
	Irinej Bulović	Bishop of Bačka	2025; Previously: 2001–2003, 2005–2007, 2009–2013, 2015–2017, 2018–2021, 2022–2024
	Metodije Ostojić	Bishop of Budimlja and Nikšić	2025
	Jovan Mladenović (sr)	Bishop of Šumadija	2026; Previously: 2004–2006, 2011–2014, 2018–2021
	Ilarion Golubović (sr)	Bishop of Timok	2026
Chief Secretary
	Nektarije Đurić (sr)	Archimandrite	2021

== See also ==
- Council of Bishops of the Serbian Orthodox Church
