= Eastern Orthodoxy in Montenegro =

Eastern Orthodoxy presence in Montenegro

Cathedral of the Resurrection of Christ in Podgorica

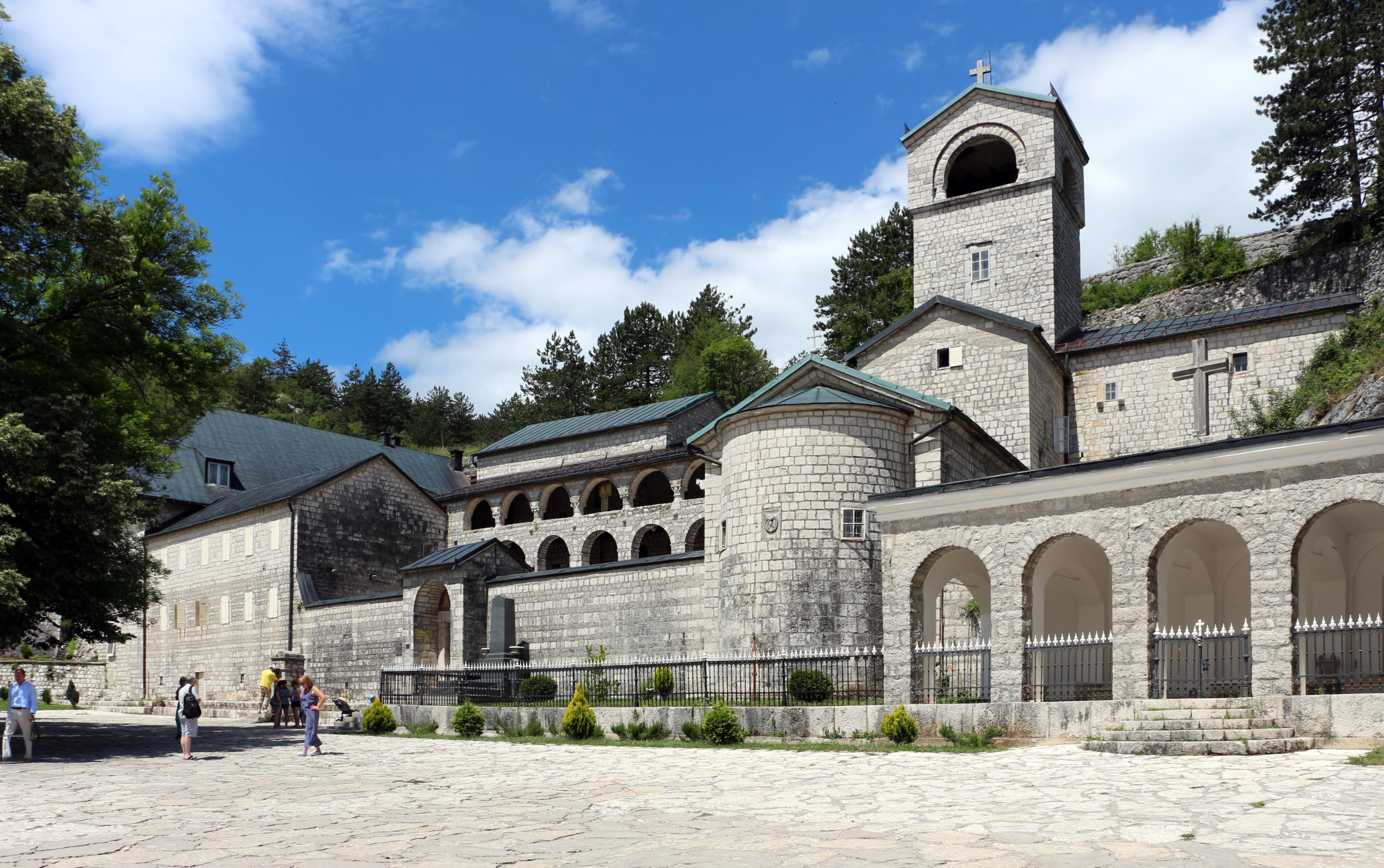
Cetinje Monastery in Cetinje

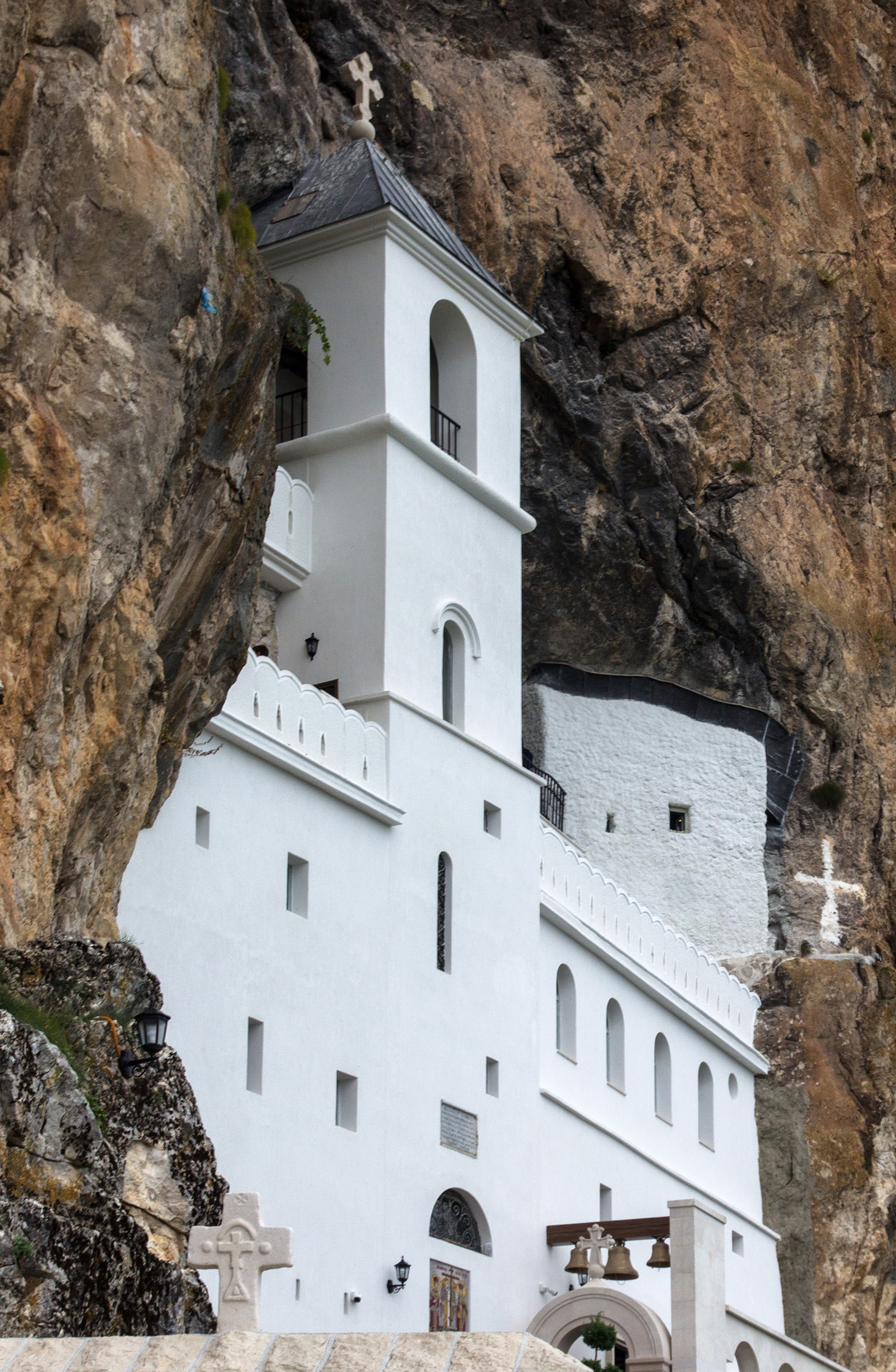
Ostrog Monastery near Nikšić

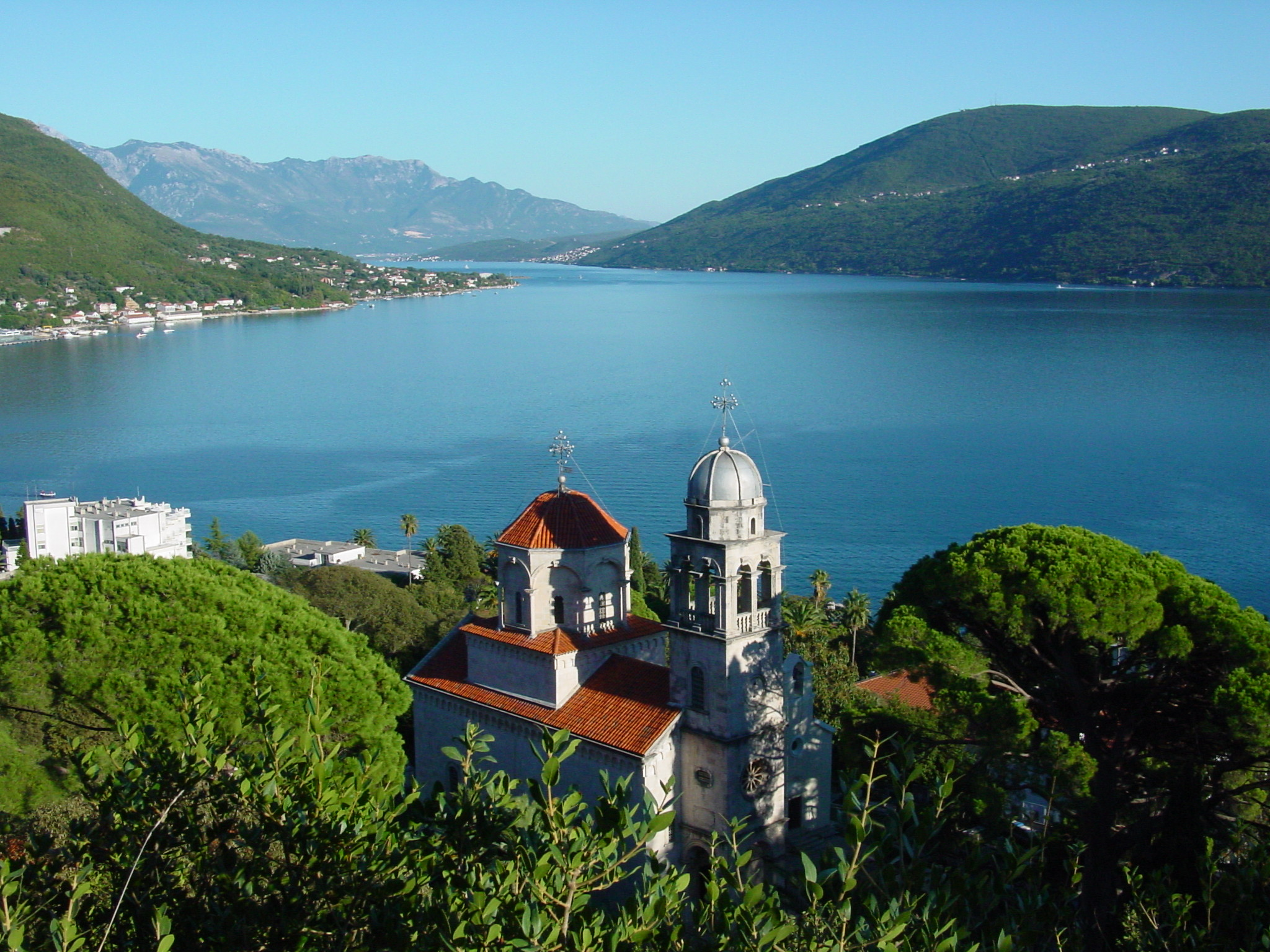
Savina Monastery in Herceg Novi

The Eastern Orthodoxy is by far the largest religious denomination in Montenegro. According to the 2023 census, there were 443,394 adherents of Eastern Orthodoxy in Montenegro, making up 71.1% of the population.

The Serbian Orthodox Church is the sole Eastern Orthodox canonical jurisdiction in the territory of Montenegro, although canonically unrecognized Montenegrin Orthodox Church also has some limited presence.

== Demographics ==
The published data from the 2023 Census included a crosstab of ethnicity and religion, which showed that Eastern Orthodox believers were divided between the following ethnic groups:

- 211,398 Montenegrins (47.6%)
- 203,990 Serbs (46%)
- 8,587 Russians (1.9%)
- 2,393 Ukrainians (0.5%)
- 1,692 Serbs-Montenegrins (0.4%)
- 1,246 Montenegrins-Serbs (0.3%)
- 14,088 others, undeclared or unknown (3.1%)

== Serbian Orthodox Church in Montenegro ==
The Serbian Orthodox Church, to which the overwhelming majority of Eastern Orthodox Christians in the country adhere, exercise its jurisdiction in the territory of Montenegro through the following dioceses:

- Metropolitanate of Montenegro and the Littoral; seat in Cetinje and the episcopal see at the Cathedral of the Resurrection of Christ in Podgorica.
- Eparchy of Budimlja and Nikšić; seat in Berane and the episcopal see at the Saint Basil of Ostrog Cathedral in Nikšić.
- Eparchy of Mileševa; partially covering northwestern corner of Montenegro, corresponding to the Pljevlja Municipality.
- Eparchy of Zachlumia, Herzegovina, and the Littoral; partially covering southwestern corner of Montenegro, corresponding to small coastal region of Sutorina.

Ostrog Monastery, near Nikšić, is the single most visited pilgrimage site within the Serbian Orthodox Church, receiving 1 to 1.2 million people annually.

== Montenegrin Orthodox Church ==
Montenegrin Orthodox Church, established in 1993 as a non-governmental organization, remains to this day canonically unrecognized church. It has a relatively low level of adherence among the Eastern Orthodox population in the country, estimated at 10% according to 2020 poll.

== See also ==
- Religion in Montenegro

== Sources ==
- Aleksov, Bojan (2014). "The Serbian Orthodox Church". Orthodox Christianity and Nationalism in Nineteenth-Century Southeastern Europe. Oxford: Oxford University Press. pp. 65–100.
- Bataković, Dušan T., ed. (2005). Histoire du peuple serbe [History of the Serbian People] (in French). Lausanne: L’Age d’Homme.
- Buchenau, Klaus (2014). "The Serbian Orthodox Church". Eastern Christianity and Politics in the Twenty-First Century. London-New York: Routledge. pp. 67–93.
- Cattaruzza, Amaël; Michels, Patrick (2005). "Dualité orthodoxe au Monténégro". Balkanologie: Revue d'études pluridisciplinaires. 9 (1–2): 235–253.
- Ćirković, Sima (2004). The Serbs. Malden: Blackwell Publishing.
- Curta, Florin (2006). Southeastern Europe in the Middle Ages, 500–1250. Cambridge: Cambridge University Press.
- Džankić, Jelena (2016). "Religion and Identity in Montenegro". Monasticism in Eastern Europe and the Former Soviet Republics. London-New York: Routledge. pp. 110–129.
- Fine, John Van Antwerp Jr. (1994) [1987]. The Late Medieval Balkans: A Critical Survey from the Late Twelfth Century to the Ottoman Conquest. Ann Arbor, Michigan: University of Michigan Press.
- Fotić, Aleksandar (2008). "Serbian Orthodox Church". Encyclopedia of the Ottoman Empire. New York: Infobase Publishing. pp. 519–520.
- Ivić, Pavle, ed. (1995). The History of Serbian Culture. Edgware: Porthill Publishers.
- Jelavich, Barbara (1983a). History of the Balkans: Eighteenth and Nineteenth Centuries. Vol. 1. Cambridge University Press.
- Jelavich, Barbara (1983b). History of the Balkans: Twentieth Century. Vol. 2. Cambridge University Press.
- Mileusnić, Slobodan, ed. (1989). Serbian Orthodox Church: Its past and present. Vol. 7. Belgrade: Serbian Orthodox Church.
- Morrison, Kenneth (2009). Montenegro: A Modern History. London-New York: I.B.Tauris.
- Morrison, Kenneth; Čagorović, Nebojša (2014). "The Political Dynamics of Intra-Orthodox Conflict in Montenegro". Politicization of Religion, the Power of State, Nation, and Faith: The Case of Former Yugoslavia and its Successor States. New York: Palgrave Macmillan. pp. 151–170. doi:10.1057/9781137477866_7. ISBN 978-1-349-50339-1.
- Pavlovich, Paul (1989). The History of the Serbian Orthodox Church. Serbian Heritage Books.
- Popović, Svetlana (2002). "The Serbian Episcopal sees in the thirteenth century". Старинар (51: 2001): 171–184.
- Radić, Radmila (2007). "Serbian Christianity". The Blackwell Companion to Eastern Christianity. Malden: Blackwell Publishing. pp. 231–248.
- Samardžić, Radovan; Duškov, Milan, eds. (1993). Serbs in European Civilization. Belgrade: Nova, Serbian Academy of Sciences and Arts, Institute for Balkan Studies.
- Sotirović, Vladislav B. (2011). "The Serbian Patriarchate of Peć in the Ottoman Empire: The First Phase (1557–94)". 25 (2): 143–169.
- Wachtel, Andrew B. (2004). "How to Use a Classic: Petar Petrović-Njegoš in the Twentieth Century". Ideologies and National Identities: The Case of Twentieth-Century Southeastern Europe. Budapest: Central European University Press. pp. 131–153.
