= Kać Monastery =

Serbian Orthodox monastery in Kać, Serbia

- Манастир Каћ
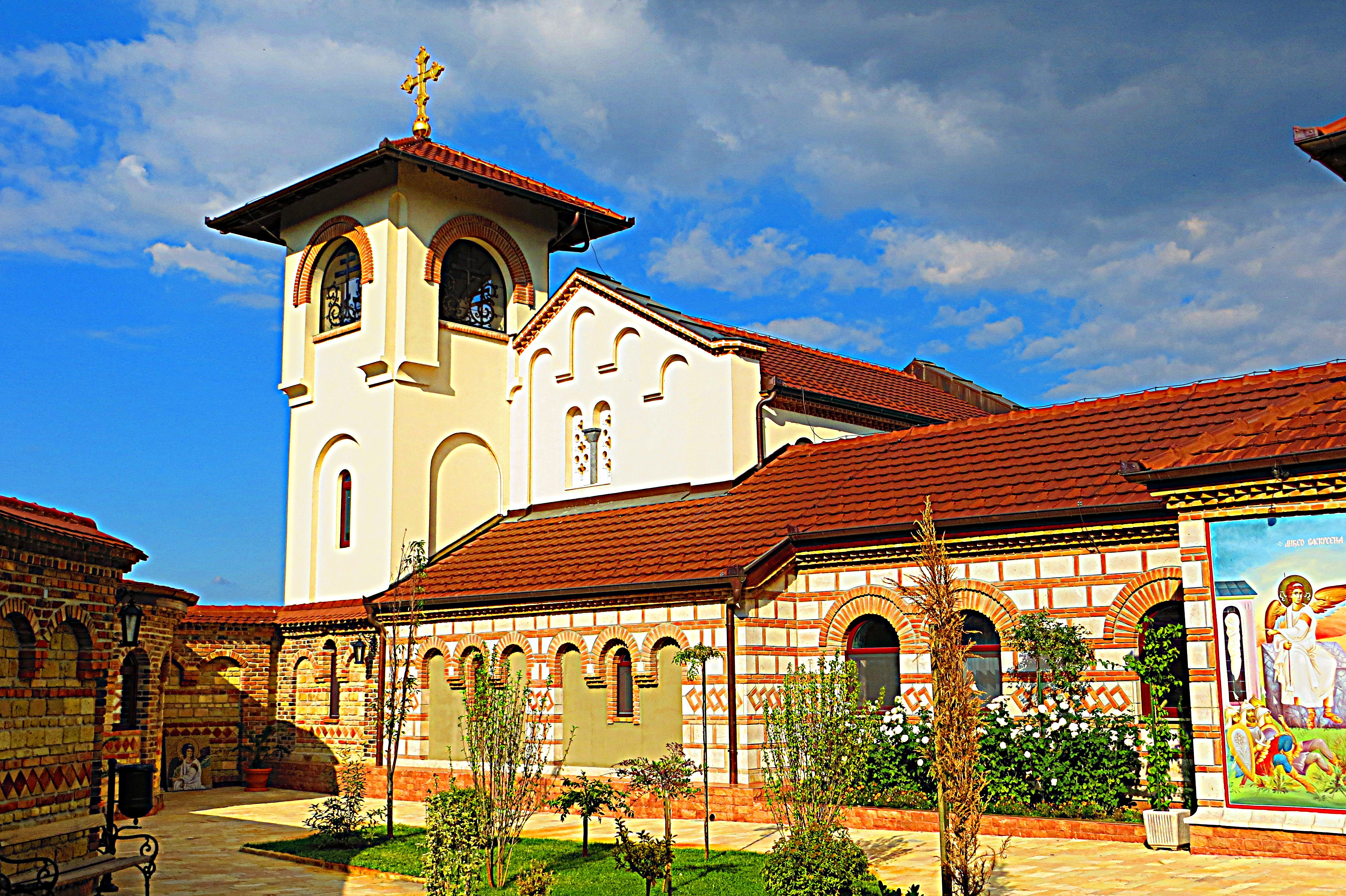
- Kać Monastery

- Location within Serbia

Monastery information
- Full name: Monastery of the Resurrection of Christ
- Order: Serbian Orthodox
- Denomination: Eastern Orthodox
- Established: 2010
- Dedication: Resurrection of Christ
- Diocese: Eparchy of Bačka

People
- Founders: Bishop Irinej Bulović and nun Porfirija

Architecture
- Functional status: Active
- Style: Athonite
- Groundbreaking: 2007

Site
- Location: Kać, Novi Sad
- Country: Serbia
- Coordinates: 45.3025°N 19.9385°E
- Public access: yes

The Kać Monastery (Serbian: Манастир Каћ, romanized: Manastir Kać), officially the Monastery of the Resurrection of Christ, is a Serbian Orthodox monastery belonging to the Eparchy of Bačka. It is located 10 kilometres east of Novi Sad, in the Sunčani Breg neighbourhood of Kać, near Šajkaš along the road toward Titel.

== History ==
The monastery was built through the initiative and efforts of Irinej, Bishop of Bačka, and nun Porfirija. Construction began with the laying of the foundations in 2007, and it was completed in 2010. Designed in the Athonite architectural style, the complex features protective walls and a gate surrounding the grounds. It is dedicated to the Resurrection of Christ.

== Gallery ==
Monastery of the Resurrection of Christ

Monastery of the Resurrection of Christ

Monastery of the Resurrection of Christ – courtyard

Kać Monastery
