= List of cathedrals in Montenegro =

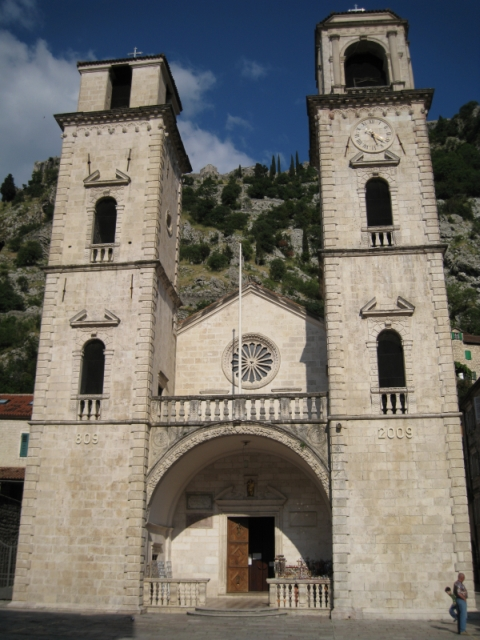
Cathedral of St. Tryphon in Kotor.

This is the list of cathedrals in Montenegro sorted by denomination.

== Orthodox ==
Cathedrals of the Serbian Orthodox Church:

- Cathedral of the Resurrection of Christ in Podgorica
- Saint Basil of Ostrog Cathedral in Nikšić

== Catholic ==
Cathedrals of the Catholic Church in Montenegro:

- Saint Peter the Apostle Cathedral in Bar
- Cathedral of the Immaculate Conception in Stari Bar
- Cathedral of St. Tryphon in Kotor

== See also ==
- Lists of cathedrals by country
