= Grnčarica Monastery =

Orthodox Monastery

Grnčarica Monastery Манастир Грнчарица
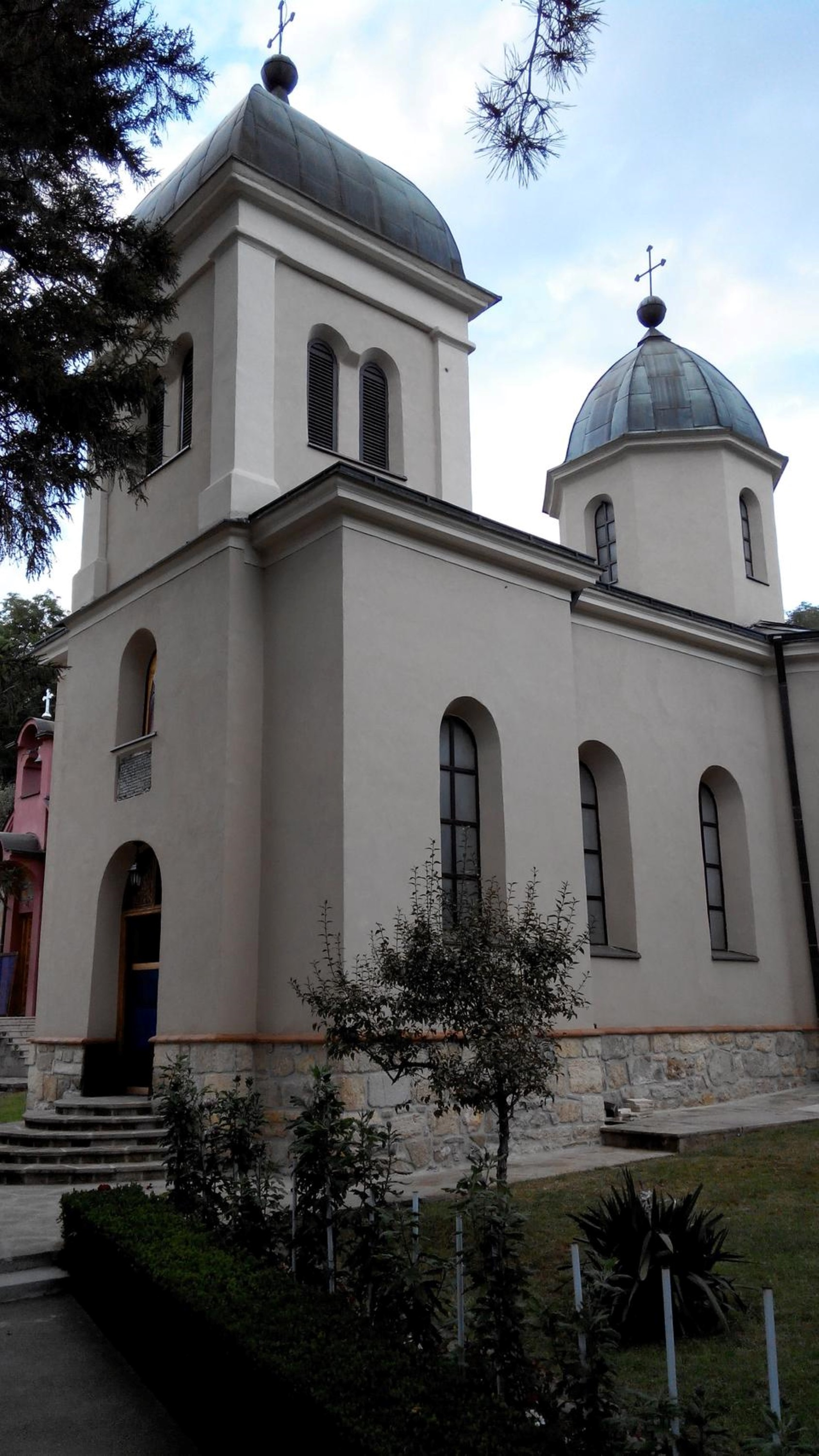
- Interactive map of Grnčarica Monastery; Манастир Грнчарица

Monastery information
- Full name: Манастир – Грнчарица
- Order: Serbian Orthodox
- Established: 13th century
- Dedication: Saint Nicholas

People
- Founder: Unknown

Site
- Location: Prnjavor
- Coordinates: 44°05′55″N 21°01′04″E
- Public access: Yes

Grnčarica Monastery is a women's monastery of the Serbian Orthodox Church, belonging to the Eparchy of Šumadija. It is dedicated to Saint Nicholas. It is located in the village of Prnjavor, Serbia, which is about 10 km from Batočina and about 15 km from Kragujevac.

The monastery represents an immovable cultural asset as a cultural monument.

== History ==
According to legend, the monastery was built during the reign of King Stefan Dragutin at the end of the 13th or the beginning of the 14th century. Legend has it that the monastery was first built on Čukara near the spring of Mladens water. During the invasion of the Turks, the church was demolished and a new Grnčarica was built from its materials in today's hidden place.

It is more likely that the Grnčarica monastery was built in the middle of the 16th century, after the restoration of the Serbian Patriarchate of Peć. According to the inscription above the entrance door, Grnčarica was "created and listed" during the time of the Turkish Sultan Suleiman the Magnificent through the efforts and efforts of Abbot Maxim and his brotherhood. The word "created" was also used when the church was being rebuilt after demolition or neglect.

In the Turkish census of 1739/41, the monastery was marked as the monastery of St. Nicholas near the village of Grnčarica, but it was deserted. The monastery most likely came to life again at the end of the 18th century, during the reign of the Belgrade vizier Hadži Mustafa Pasha, who was remembered for his gentle attitude towards the Serbian people, which is why he was called the "Serbian mother".

It is not known how, but in 1835 Grnčarica was not considered a monastery, but only a parish church. With the arrival of the Defender of the Constitution, the position of Gračanica was adjusted and it again became a monastery.

Professor Josif Veselić from Kragujevac visited and described monasteries in Serbia in 1861 and 1862. Describing Grnačrica, he said that the walls were plain, rough and cracked, much damaged, painted over, but also with preserved old paintings. In the middle hung a gilded and beautifully decorated pole, like the other one in the church's vestibule. The pathos is made of brick, and the pulpit is made of white and blue marble from Studenica. The monastery had all the necessary church books with the three gospels. There are a lot of illegible inscriptions on the walls, and the one that talks about the restoration of the monastery during the time of Suleiman the Magnificent is the best read. Veselić also says that it is known for certain that the monastery was burned down in Kočina Krajina.

During the First World War, the Austro-Hungarian army ravaged the monastery, burned the archive and took away three bells. The monastery suffered the same fate during the Second World War. The Germans exiled the monks, the monastery quarters and set fire to the monastery. After the war, in 1946, Abbess Efrosini came to the abandoned and destroyed monastery with four nuns from the Monastery of Saint Petka in Izvor near Paraćin. Since then Grnčarica became a women's monastery.

== Architecture ==
The monastery church has a triconchal base, vaulted with a semi-shaped vault with a slender octagonal dome above the central space. The altar apse and side conchs are semicircular on the outside and inside. To the west is a massive square belfry with four bifores. The facades are without decorative ornamentation. The roof is pitched and covered with galvanized sheet.

The painting is the work of Valerijan (Stefanović), the first Bishop of Šumadija, who painted it in the second half of the 20th century.
