= Metodije Ostojić =

Serbian Orthodox bishops

His Eminence Metodije Ostojić
- Bishop of Budimlja and Nikšić
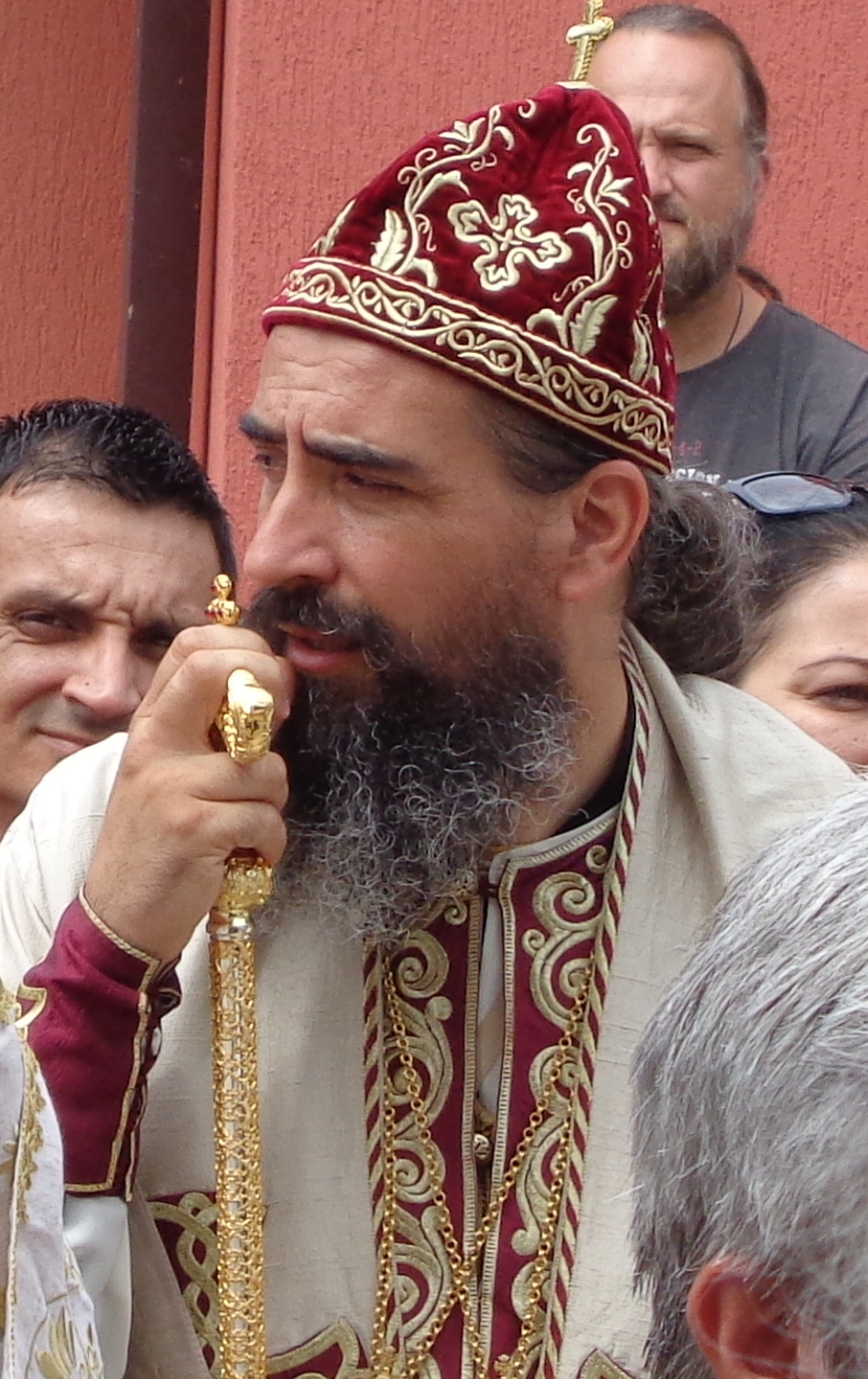
- Bishop Metodije in 2019
- Church: Serbian Orthodox Church
- Diocese: Eparchy of Budimlja and Nikšić
- Predecessor: Joanikije Mićović

Orders
- Ordination: 2004
- Consecration: 2018

Personal details
- Born: Ljubiša Ostojić; 1 April 1976 (age 50) Sarajevo, SFR Yugoslavia
- Denomination: Eastern Orthodox Christian
- Residence: Berane, Montenegro
- Education: University of Montenegro

Bishop Metodije (Serbian Cyrillic: Методије, secular name Ljubiša Ostojić, Serbian Cyrillic: Љубиша Остојић; born 1 April 1976) is a Serbian Orthodox bishop from Montenegro who has served as the head of the Eparchy of Budimlja and Nikšić (headquartered in the town of Berane) since 29 May 2021. He is a former auxiliary bishop in the Metropolitanate of Montenegro and the Littoral (2018–2021).

== Biography ==
He was born on 1 April 1976 in Sarajevo to Milinko and Dragica (née Milićević), the third child. His parents come from Žabljak in northern Montenegro. He is related to Milojko Spajić, a member of the Krivokapić government since December 2020, following the parliamentary election in August that year.

Upon finishing a secondary school and two years in the Gymnasium in Sarajevo, due to the outbreak of war in BiH, he relocated to Podgorica along with his family. In 1994, he finished the high school and enrolled at the Economics department of the University of Montenegro, from which he took a degree in 2001.

He was ordained a monk in the Cetinje Monastery on 11 July 2004. He was ordained a deacon on 19 August 2004 and a presbyter (hieromonk) on 6 January 2008.

From the end of 2007, he was a personal assistant (cell-attendant) to Patriarch Pavle, until Pavle's death in November 2008.

On 1 February 2010, he was appointed Father Superior of the Cetinje Monastery, where he was elevated to Archimandrite on 12 July 2013. The same year, he graduated from the Orthodox Theological Faculty of the University of East Sarajevo in Foča.

In 2015, at the Orthodox Theological Faculty of the University of Belgrade he defended his master's thesis on the topic of Vavila, Metropolitan of Zeta (1494–1520) and his contribution to Serbian spirituality and culture, under the mentorship of prof. Dr. Predrag Puzović.

From 2012, he was a member of the Patriarchal Board of Directors of the Serbian Orthodox Church on behalf of the Metropolitanate of Montenegro and the Littoral. He was also a member of the Diocesan Council and the Diocesan Board of Directors of the Metropolitanate of Montenegro and the Littoral.

In 2016–2017, he studied Greek at Aristotle University of Thessaloniki in Thessaloniki, Greece.

He was consecrated as auxiliary bishop by Patriarch Irinej in the Cathedral of the Resurrection of Christ in Podgorica on 22 July 2018. Since August 2018, he served as editor-in-chief of the journal Svetigora of the Metropolitanate of Montenegro and the Littoral.

On 26 December 2019, in the course of the clerical protests, he was beaten by police with batons on Đurđevića Tara Bridge.

On 29 May 2021, in the Belgrade Church of Saint Sava, he was elected by the Bishops' Council of the SOC as Bishop of Budimlja and Nikšić.

On 26 September 2021, he was enthroned by Patriarch Porfirije at Đurđevi Stupovi Monastery in Berane.

Serbian Orthodox Church titles
Preceded by Joanikije Mićović	Bishop of Budimlja and Nikšić; 2021 – present	Incumbent
