= Bijela Monastery =

Serbian Orthodox monastery near Šavnik, Montenegro

Religion
- Affiliation: Serbian Orthodox Church
- Ecclesiastical or organizational status: Eparchy of Budimlja and Nikšić

Location
- Interactive map of Bijela Monastery
- Coordinates: 42°56′24.62″N 19°6′1.75″E

The Bijela Monastery (Serbian: Манастир Бијела, romanized: Manastir Bijela) is a Serbian Orthodox monastery near Bijela village in Šavnik, modern-day Montenegro. The monastery was first mentioned in 1656 while according to some legends it was built in 1010 by duke Vulović from Bijela and ban Kozlina of Tušina, financially supported by Jovan Vladimir. The reconstruction of the monastery began at the end of the 20th century. Its church is dedicated to Saint George, a saint of Drobnjaci clan.

== See also ==
- List of Serbian Orthodox monasteries
