= Velimlje =

Velimlje Велимље
- Village
- Location within Montenegro
- Coordinates: 42.820155°N 18.633657°E
- Country: Montenegro
- Municipality: Nikšić

Population (2011)
  - Total: 109
- Time zone: UTC+1 (CET)
  - Summer (DST): UTC+2 (CEST)
- Vehicle registration: NK

Velimlje (Serbian Cyrillic: Велимље) is a village in the municipality of Nikšić, Montenegro. Until 1960 it was a center of Banjskovučedolska municipality.

== Demographics ==
According to the 2011 census, its population was 109.

Ethnicity in 2011
Ethnicity	Number	Percentage
Montenegrins	63	57.8%
Serbs	36	33.0%
other/undeclared	10	9.2%
Total	109	100%

== Notable individuals ==
- Joanikije II, Metropolitan of Montenegro
