= Serbian Orthodox Eparchy of Austria =

Diocese of the Serbian Orthodox Church

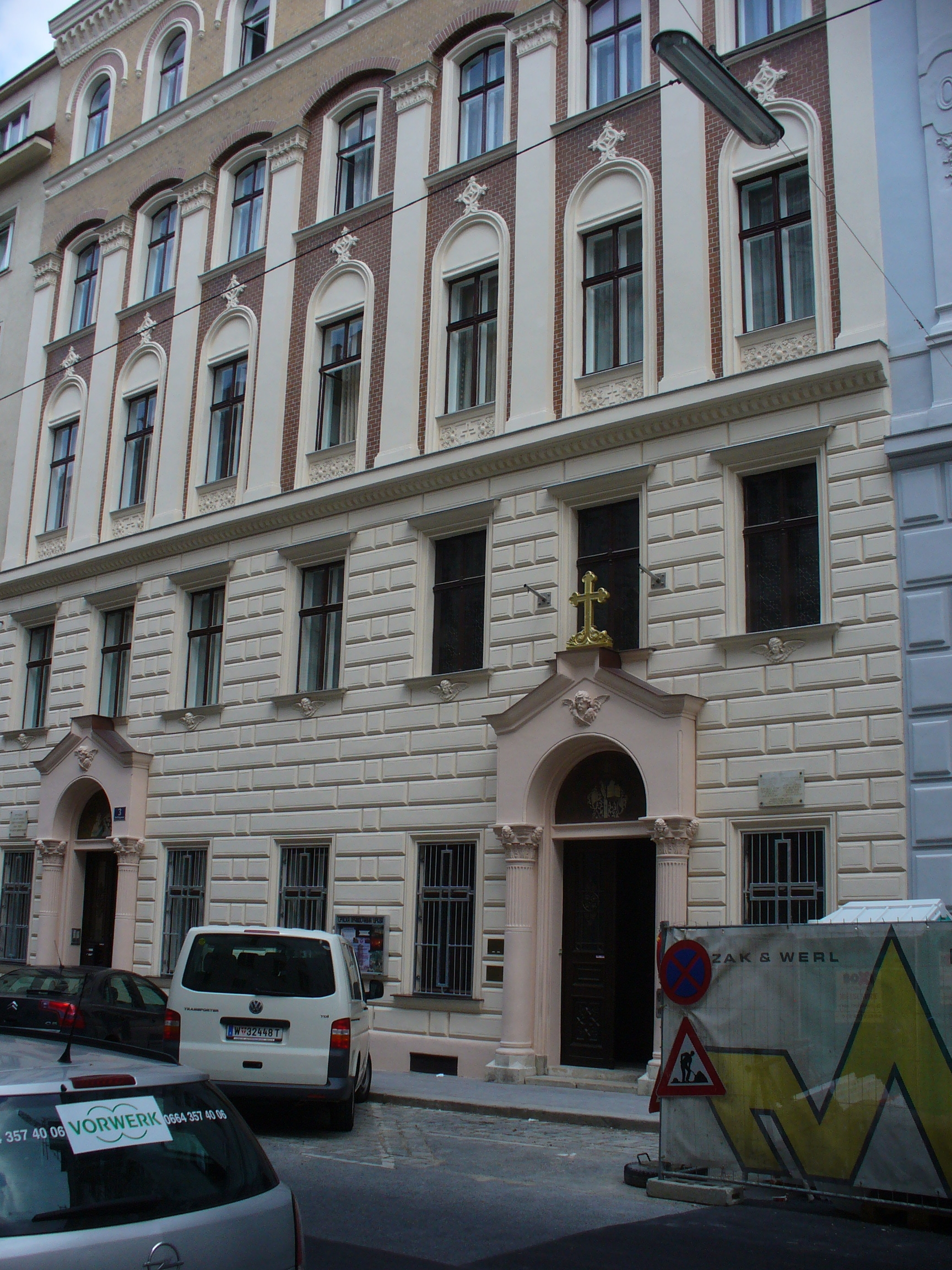
- Saint Sava Cathedral, Vienna

Location
- Territory: Austria
- Headquarters: Vienna

Information
- Denomination: Eastern Orthodox
- Sui iuris church: Serbian Orthodox Church
- Established: 2011 (as Austria and Switzerland); 2024 (as Austria)
- Cathedral: Saint Sava Cathedral, Vienna
- Language: Church Slavonic, Serbian, German

Current leadership
- Bishop: Irinej Bulović (administrator)

Map

Website
- Serbian Orthodox Eparchy of Austria

The Serbian Orthodox Eparchy of Austria (Serbian: Српска православна епархија аустријска, romanized: Srpska pravoslavna eparhija austrijska; German: Serbische Orthodoxe Diözese von Österreich) is a diocese (eparchy) of the Serbian Orthodox Church, covering Austria.

== History ==
Serbian Orthodox Church has a long historical presence in the territory of modern Austria. By the end of the Middle Ages, migration of Eastern Orthodox Serbs towards Austrian lands was caused by expansion of the Ottoman Empire. Exiled members of Serbian royal and noble families were welcomed by Habsburg rulers, who granted them new possessions. In 1479, emperor Friedrich III granted castle Weitensfeld in Carinthia to exiled members of Branković dynasty of Serbia. Often accompanied by their priests, exiled Serbian families created first Eastern Orthodox cells in Austrian lands.

During the period of Ottoman–Habsburg wars (from 16th to 18th century), Habsburg policy towards Eastern Orthodox Serbs was marked by special interests, related to complex political and religious situation in various regions of the expanding Habsburg monarchy. Emperor Leopold I issued several charters (1690, 1691, 1695) to Eastern Orthodox Serbs, who sided with Habsburgs during the Great Turkish War, granting them religious freedom in the Monarchy. Serbian Orthodox patriarch Arsenije III visited Austrian capital (Vienna) on several occasions, and died there in 1706.

Serbian Orthodox metropolitan Isaija Đaković, who visited Austrian capital on several occasions since 1690, also died in Vienna, in 1708. During the 18th and 19th century, communities of ethnic Serbs were developing in several Austrian cities, consisted mainly of merchants, officers and students, who were under the spiritual jurisdiction of the Serbian Orthodox Metropolitanate of Karlovci (after 1848 Patriarchate of Karlovci).

== Structure ==
The Serbian Orthodox Eparchy of Austria comprises over 30 parishes and operates 21 churches. The episcopal see is located at the Saint Sava Cathedral in Vienna.

== Gallery ==
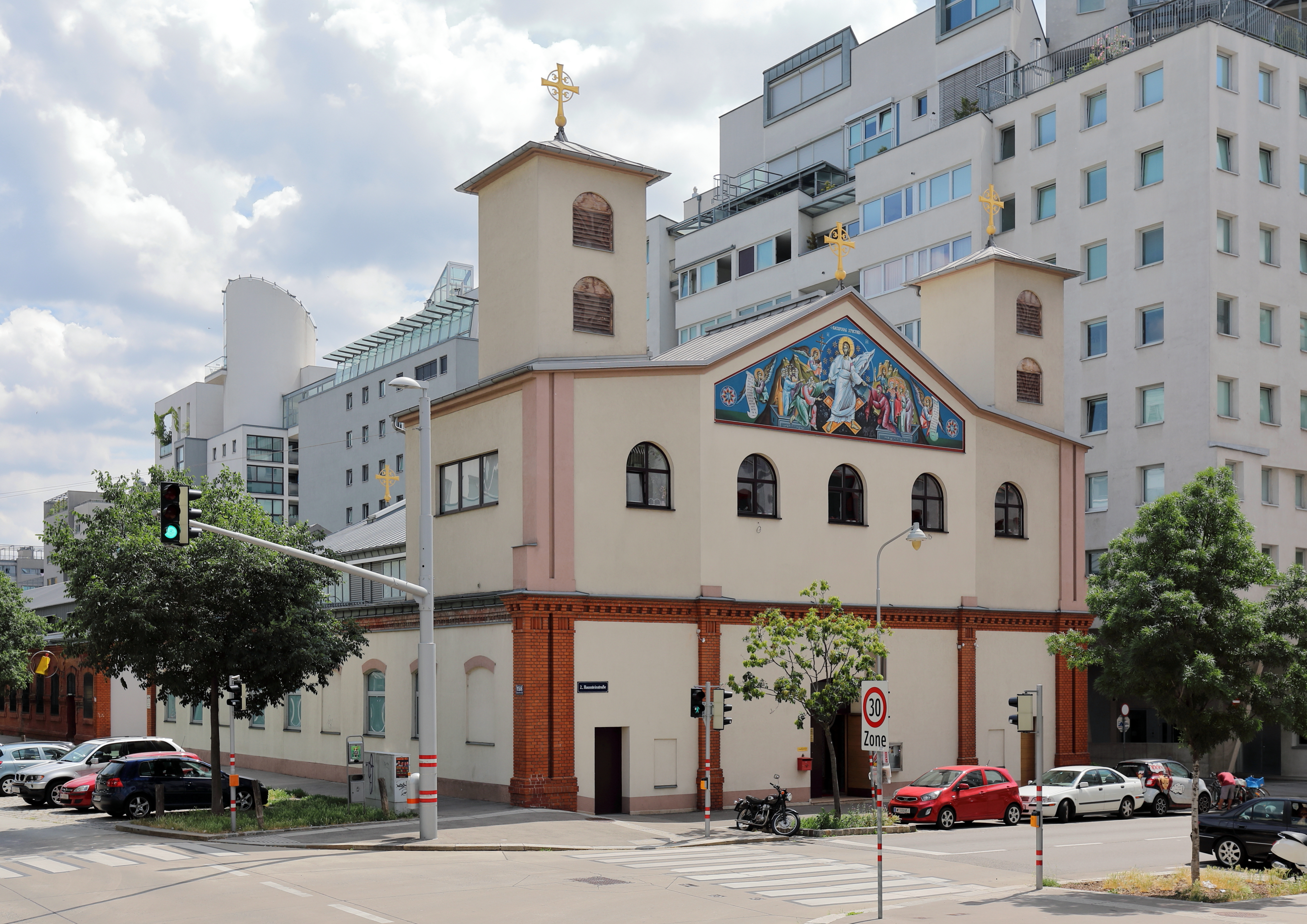
Resurrection of the Lord Church (Vienna)

== See also ==
- Eastern Orthodoxy in Austria
- Assembly of Canonical Orthodox Bishops of Austria
- Eparchies and metropolitanates of the Serbian Orthodox Church
- Serbs in Austria

== Literature ==
- Ćirković, Sima (2004). The Serbs. Malden: Blackwell Publishing. ISBN 9781405142915.
- Jireček, Constantin (1918). Geschichte der Serben. Vol. 2. Gotha: Perthes.
- Stiegnitz, Peter; Kosinski, Danuta (1990). Religions in Austria. Vienna: Federal Press Service.
- Todorović, Jelena (2006). An Orthodox Festival Book in the Habsburg Empire: Zaharija Orfelin's Festive Greeting to Mojsej Putnik (1757). Aldershot: Ashgate Publishing. ISBN 9780754656111.
