= Eparchy of Mileševa =

Diocese of the Serbian Orthodox Church

Location
- Territory: southwestern Serbia and northwestern Montenegro
- Headquarters: Prijepolje, Serbia

Information
- Denomination: Eastern Orthodox
- Sui iuris church: Serbian Orthodox Church
- Established: 1992
- Cathedral: Saint Basil of Ostrog Cathedral, Prijepolje
- Language: Church Slavonic, Serbian

Current leadership
- Bishop: Atanasije Rakita

Map

Website
- Eparchy of Mileševa

Eparchy of Mileševa (Serbian: Епархија милешевска, romanized: Eparhija mileševska) is a diocese (eparchy) of the Serbian Orthodox Church, covering Zlatibor District in southwestern Serbia and Pljevlja municipality in northwestern Montenegro.

The episcopal see is located at the Saint Basil of Ostrog Cathedral, Prijepolje. Its headquarters and bishop's residence are also in Prijepolje.

== History ==
Eparchy is based in Lim Valley and laid on the foundation of the Mileševa Monastery, established in the first half of the 13th century. Eparchy has often changed the name, but always had a seat in the Mileševa Monastery. In a remembrance to Saint Sava it was called "Glorious Archbishopric". One Metropolitan Bishop of Mileševa, whose name is unknown, crowned ban Tvrtko I of Bosnia as Serbian king and Bosnian king in 1377. The first Metropolitan Bishop of Mileševa whose name is known was David, a "close associate to Herzeg Stefan Kosača and his sons." When Herzeg Stjepan Vukčić Kosača drawing up a will, Metropolitan Bishop of Mileševa, David, wrote and was a witness during the signing of the same. After the Metropolitan David, and probably under the influence of connection Metropolitanate with the rulers of Herzegovina, hierarchs of Mileševa assume the title of Metropolitan Herzegovina and Mileševa. During the next three centuries Metropolitan and the Eparchy dwelled in the Mileševa Monastery.

The first impetus for the re-establishment of the Eparchy happened after the World War II, was to extend the title Bishop of Budimlja to Bishop of Budimlja-Lim Valley, and it lasted only a decade. Finally, the Eparchy of Mileševa was re-established in 1992.

== List of bishops ==
- Georgije Đokić (1992-1994)
- Vasilije Veinović (1994–1997)
- Filaret Mićević (1999–2015)
- Joanikije Mićović (administrator) (2015–2017)
- Atanasije Rakita (2017–present)

== Notable monasteries ==
- Mileševa
- Banja
- Holy Trinity

== Gallery ==
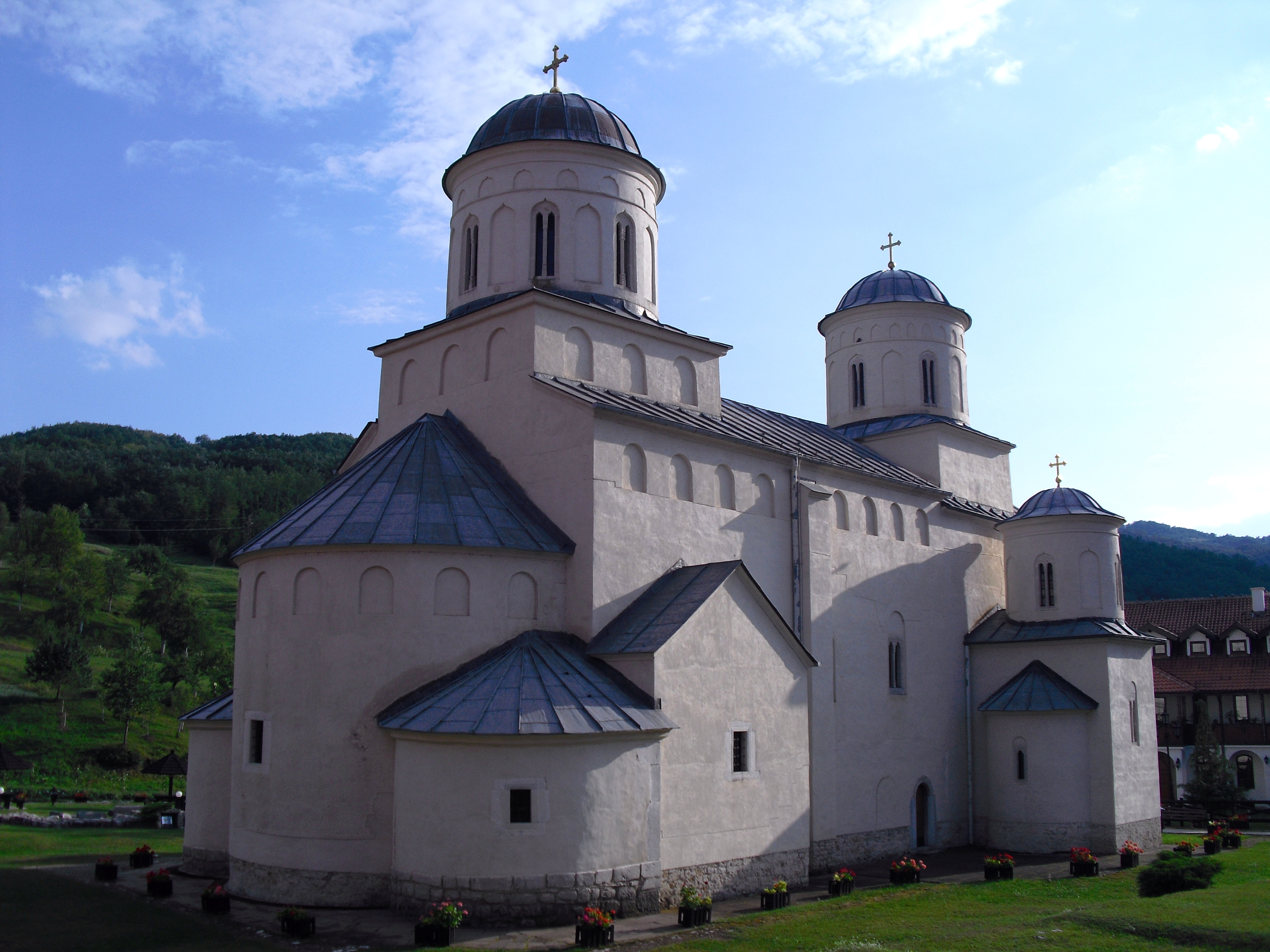
Mileševa Monastery

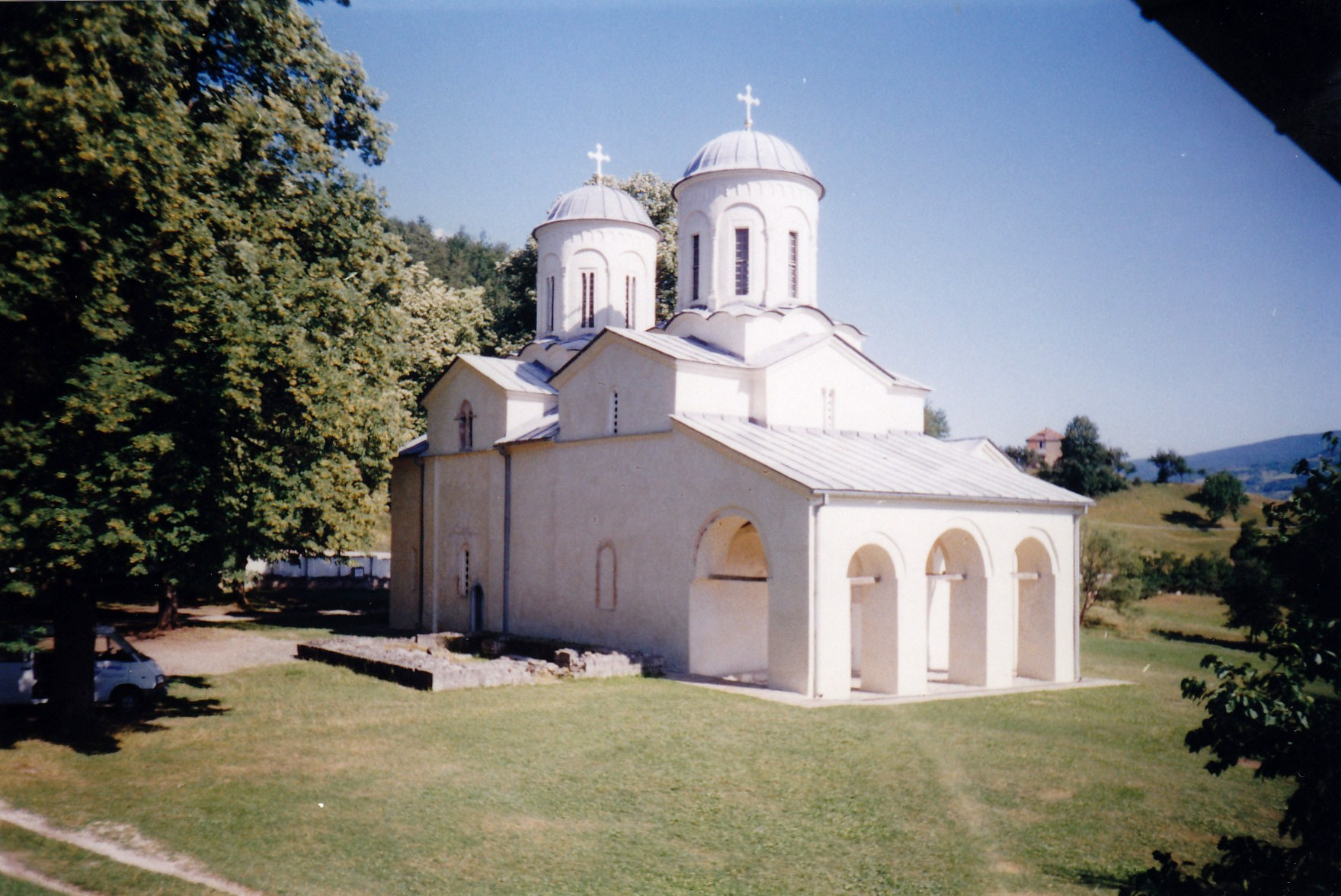
Banja Monastery

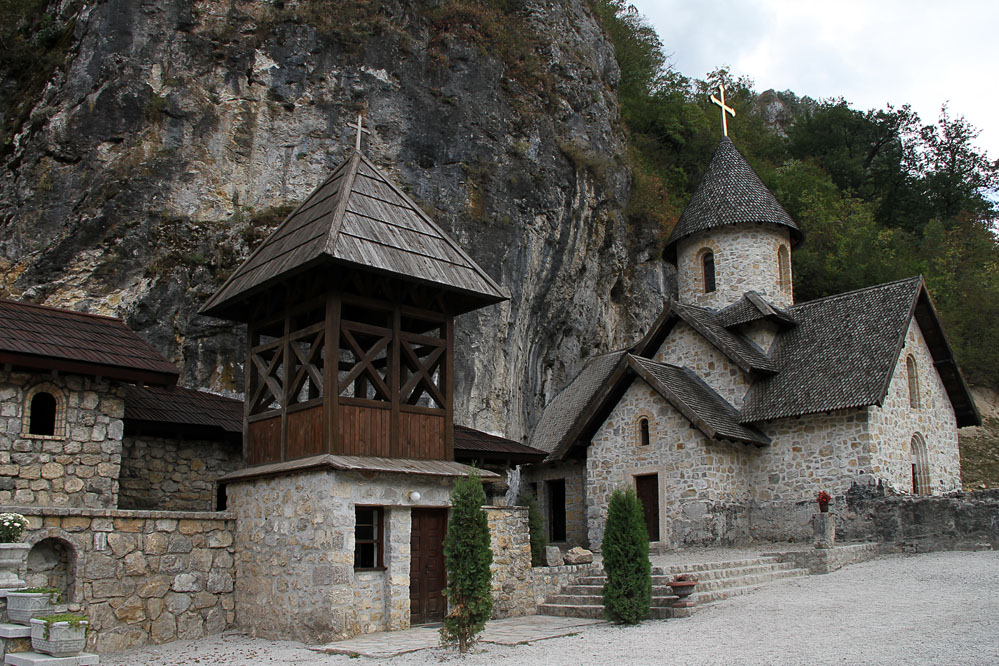
Kumanica Monastery

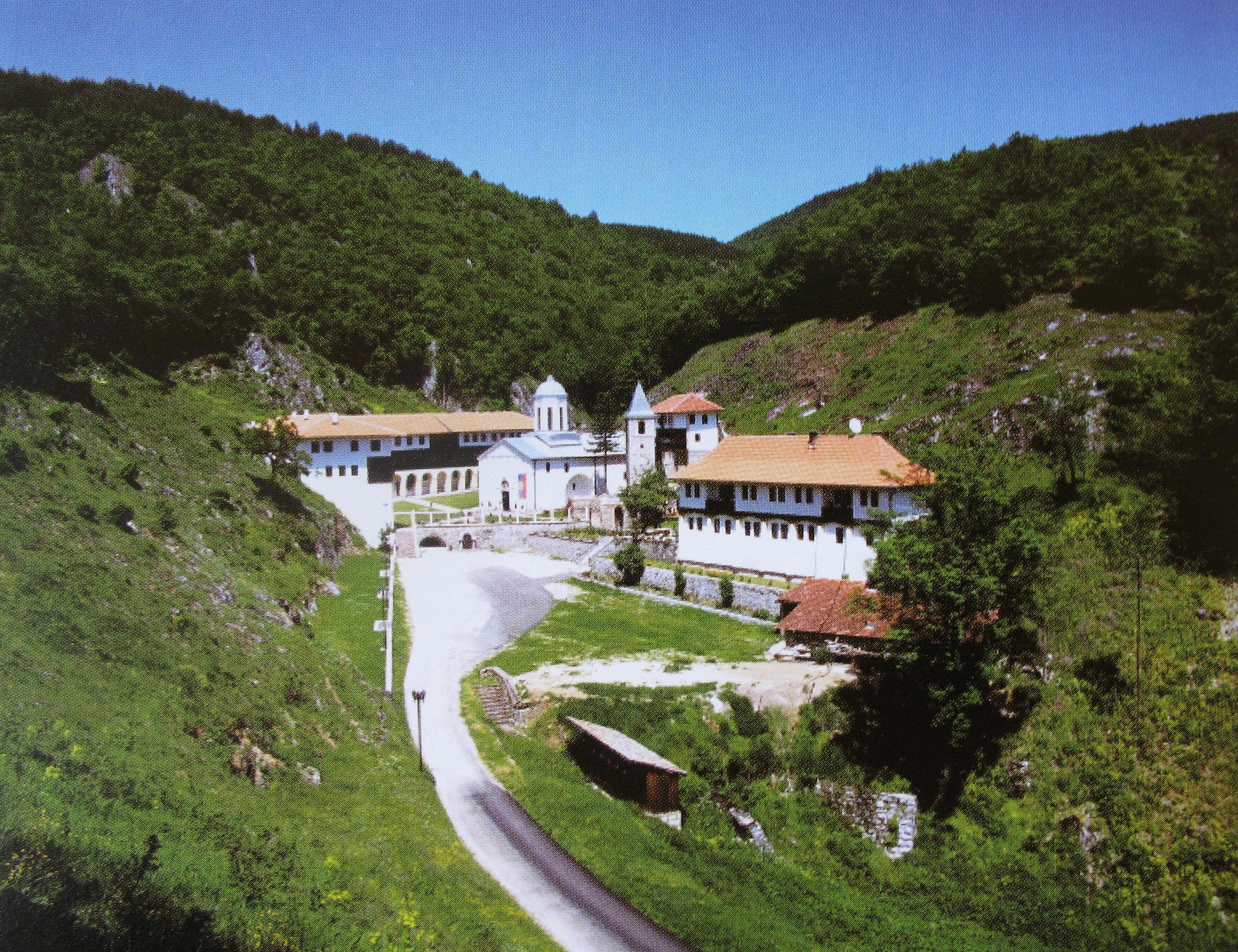
Holy Trinity Monastery

== See also ==
- Eparchies and metropolitanates of the Serbian Orthodox Church

== Sources ==
- Ćirković, Sima (2004). The Serbs. Malden: Blackwell Publishing. ISBN 9781405142915.
- Mileševska eparhija danas („Pravoslavlje“, br. 909, 1. februar 2005.)
