= Eparchy of Šumadija =

Diocese of the Serbian Orthodox Church

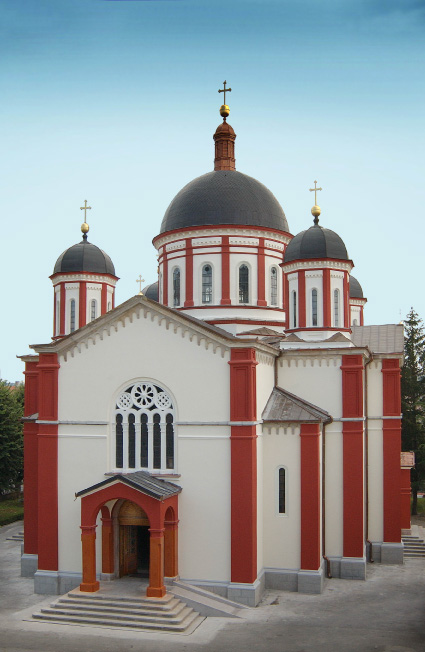
- Cathedral of the Dormition of the Theotokos, Kragujevac

Location
- Territory: Šumadija
- Headquarters: Kragujevac, Serbia

Information
- Denomination: Eastern Orthodox
- Sui iuris church: Serbian Orthodox Church
- Established: 1947
- Cathedral: Cathedral of the Dormition of the Theotokos, Kragujevac
- Language: Church Slavonic, Serbian

Current leadership
- Bishop: Jovan Mladenović

Map

Website
- Eparchy of Šumadija

The Eparchy of Šumadija (Serbian: Епархија шумадијска, romanized: Eparhija šumadijska) is a diocese (eparchy) of the Serbian Orthodox Church, covering Šumadija region in central Serbia.

The episcopal see is located at the Cathedral of the Dormition of the Theotokos, Kragujevac. Its headquarters and bishop's residence are also in Kragujevac.

== History ==
When the Serbian Patriarchate was re-established in 1920, Patriarch Dimitrije governed not only his archdiocese, which included Šumadija and Braničevo, but also the Karlovac Archdiocese. In 1931, the Požarevac and Ćuprija vicariates were addewd to the newly-established Eparchy of Braničevo, while the Archdiocese of Belgrade and Karlovci was created from the Archdiocese of Karlovci and the rest of the Diocese of Belgrade.

After the first visit of Patriarch Gavrilo to Kragujevac on Pentecost in 1938, the citizens of Kragujevac requested permission to erect a building for the eparchy, but the World War II soon broke out. After the war, at the session of the Council of Bishops in 1947, a decree was passed establishing the Eparchy of Šumadija with the vicariates of Kragujevac, Lepenica, Temnić, Levač, Belica, Jasenica, Kosmaj, Oplenac, and Kolubara-Posavina. The Vicar Bishop of Budimlja, Valerijan Stefanović, became the first bishop of Šumadija. The number of churches, church communities, monasteries, chapels and clergy increased. After the death of Bishop Valerijan Stefanović, Bishop Sava Vuković became the head of the diocese in 1977. After his death in 2001 and the one-year administration of Bishop Vasilije Kačavenda of Zvornik and Tuzla, Jovan Mladenović became the bishop of Šumadija. In 2007, the Serbian Orthodox Radio of the Eparchy of Šumadija Zlatoust was founded, a church medium that approaches the world and man from the liturgical experience of the Orthodox Church.

== List of bishops ==
- Valerijan Stefanović (1947–1976)
- Sava Vuković (1977–2001)
- Jovan Mladenović (2002–present)

== Notable monasteries ==
- Kalenić
- Voljavča
- Nikolje Rudničko
- Pavlovac
- Grnčarica

== Gallery ==
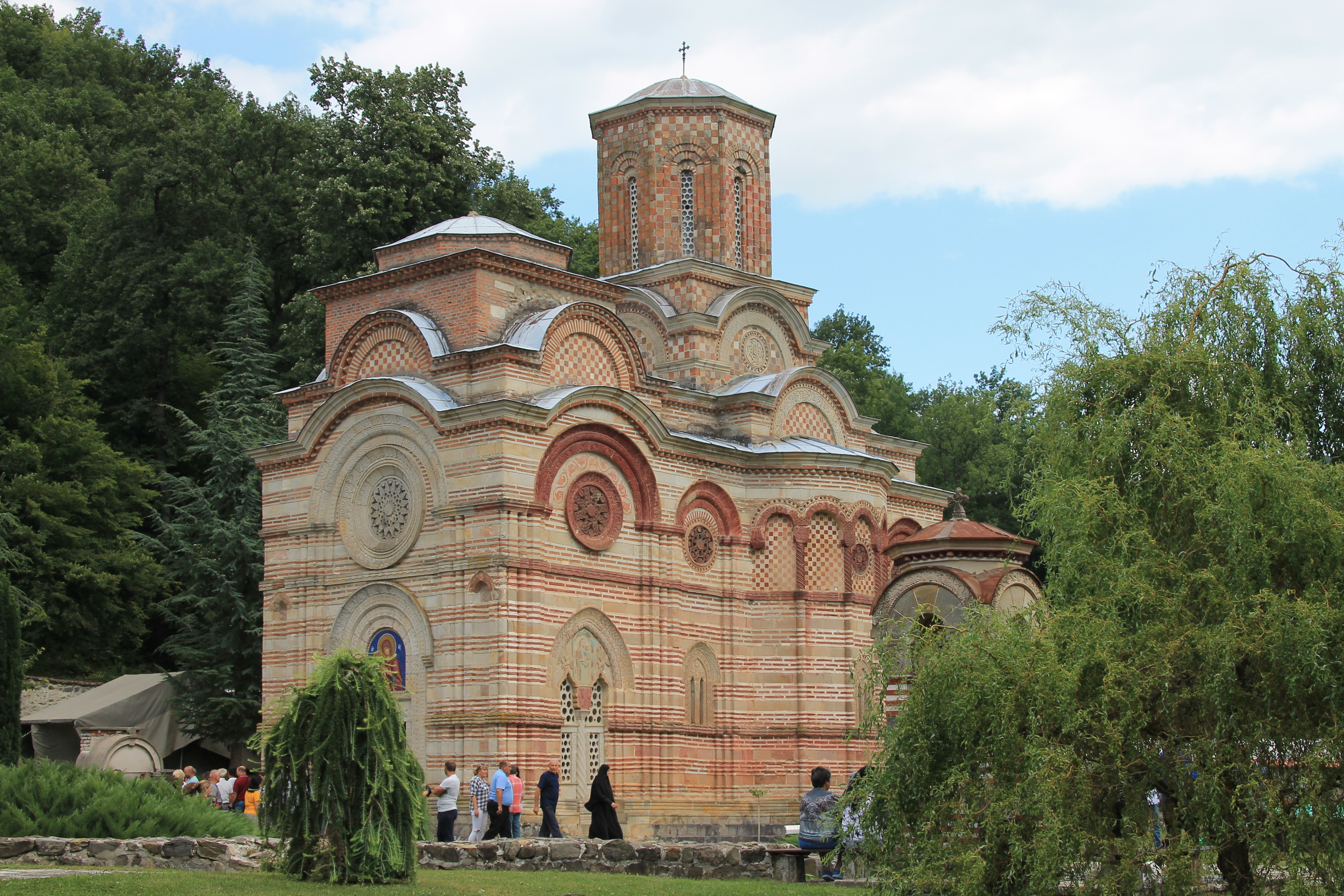
Kalenić Monastery

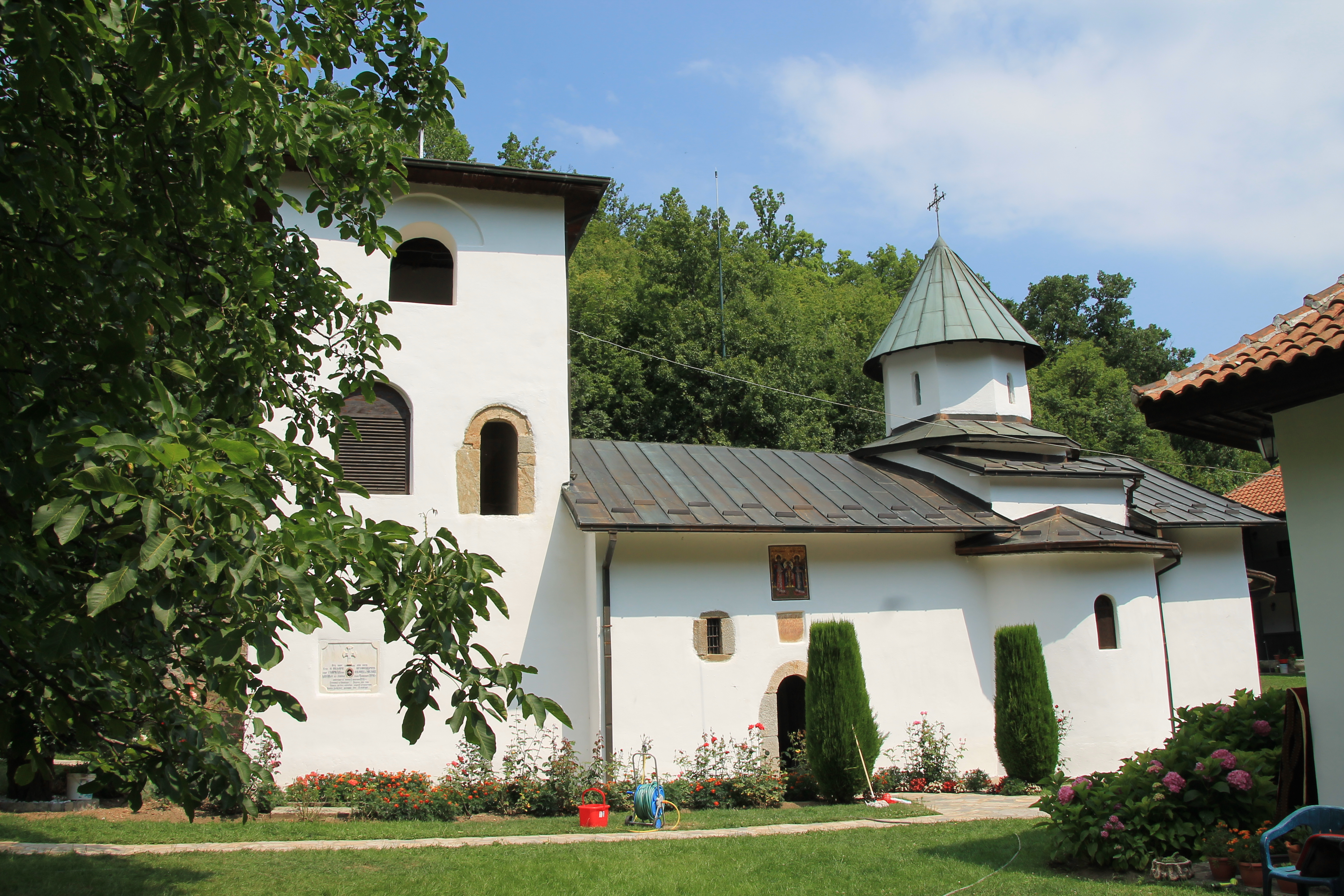
Voljavča Monastery

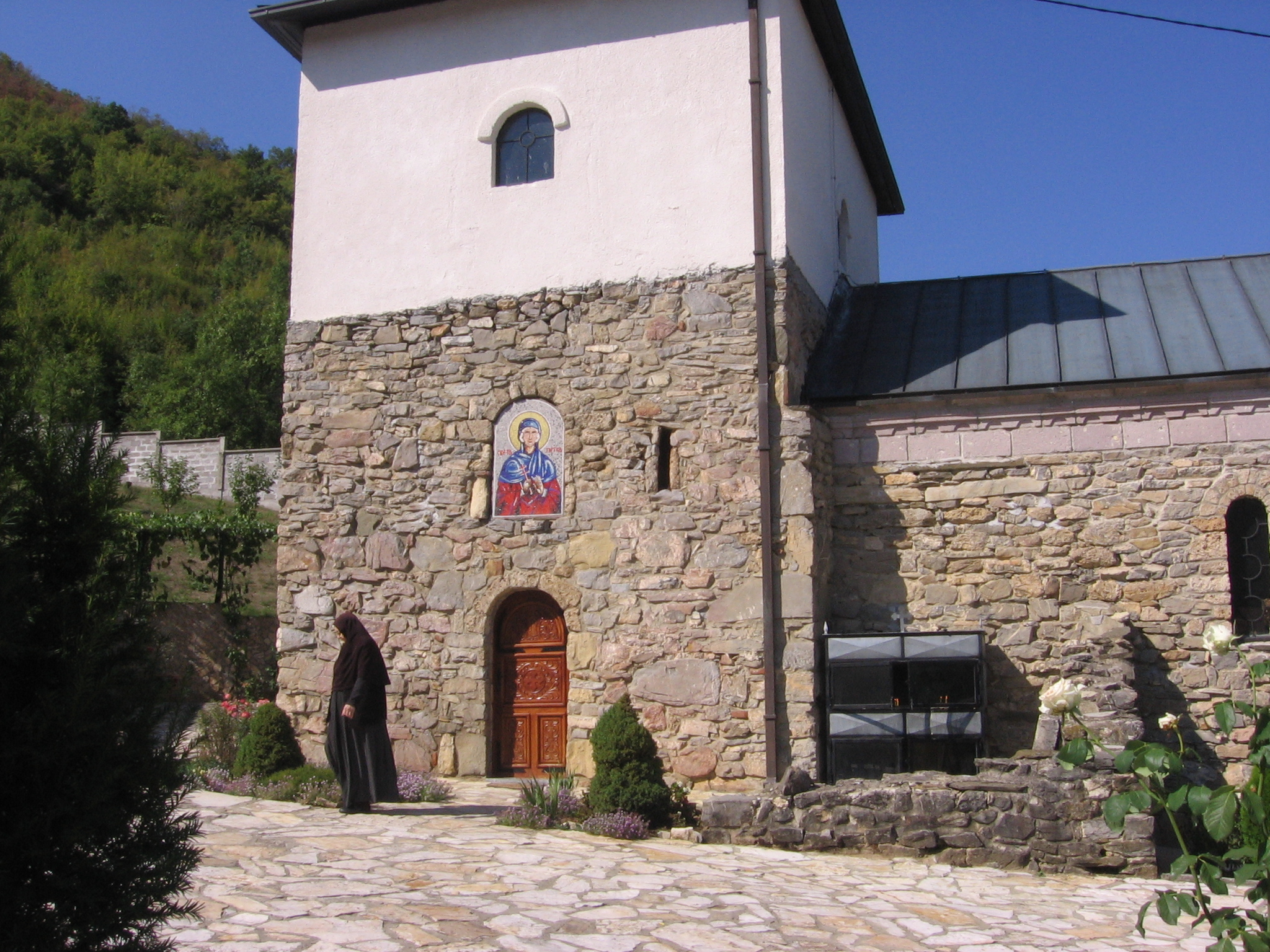
Nikolje Rudničko Monastery

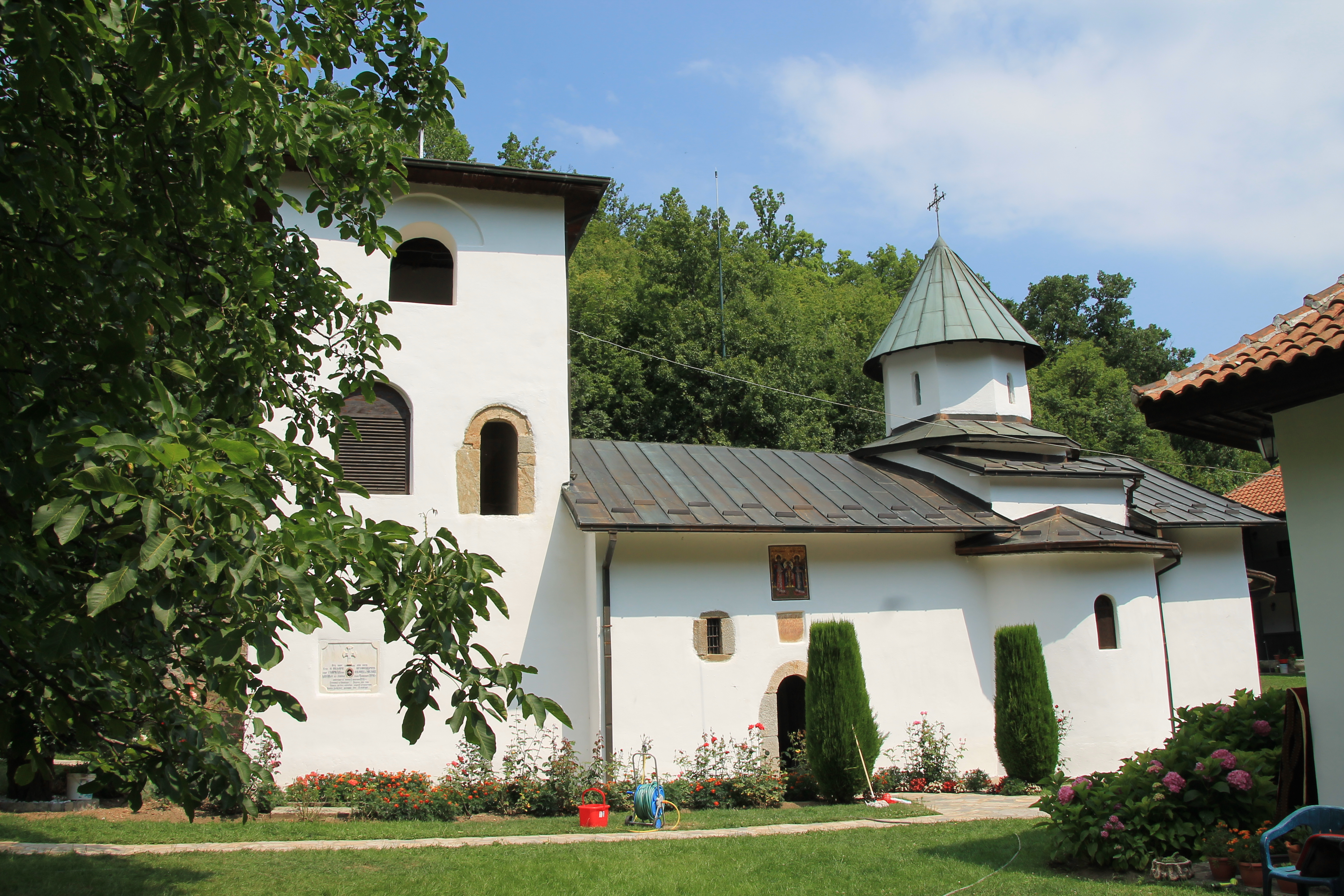
Grnčarica Monastery

== See also ==
- Eparchies and metropolitanates of the Serbian Orthodox Church
