= Eparchy of Budimlja and Nikšić =

Diocese of the Serbian Orthodox Church

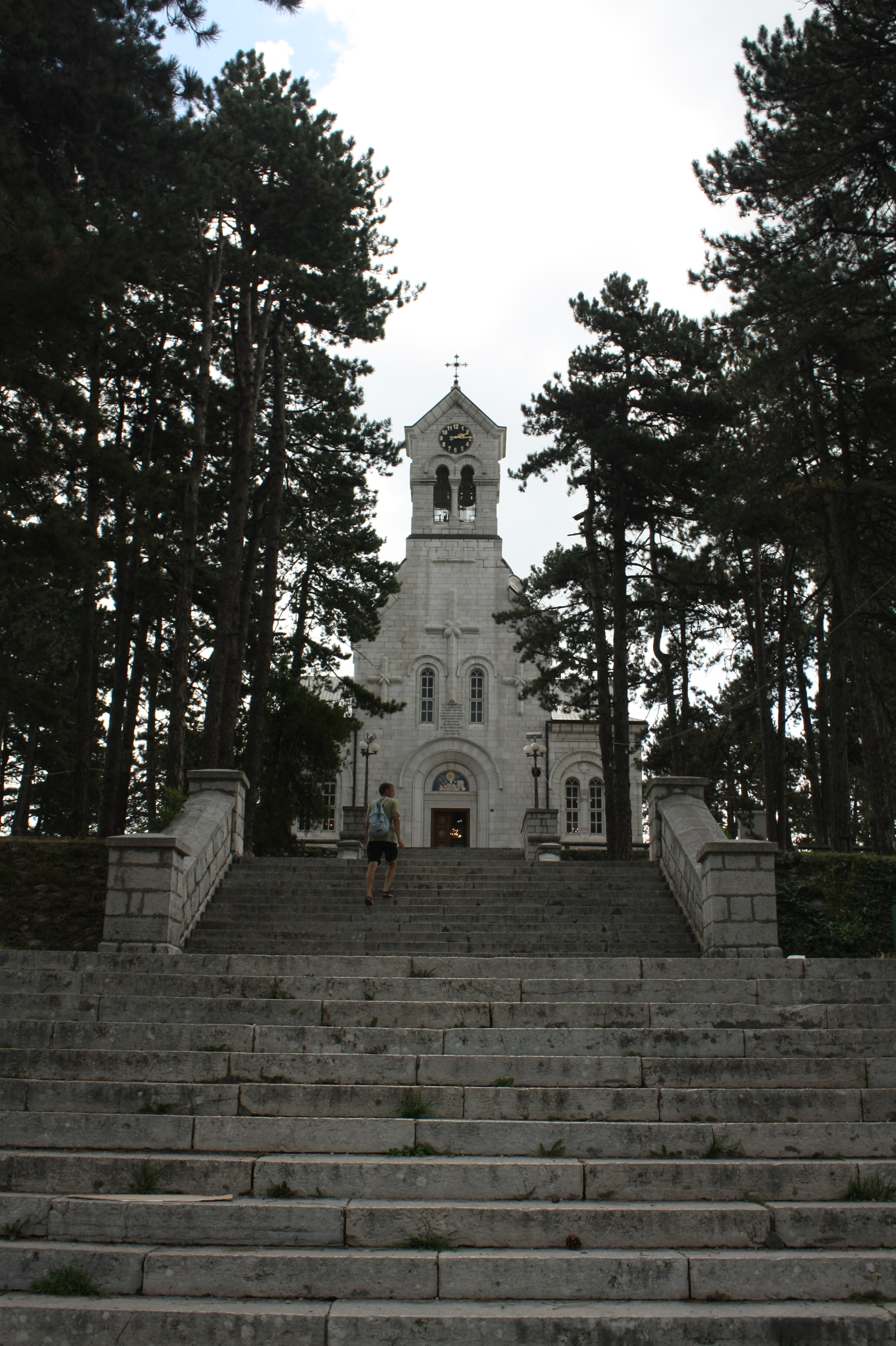
- Saint Basil of Ostrog Cathedral, Nikšić

Location
- Territory: western and northeastern Montenegro
- Headquarters: Đurđevi Stupovi Monastery, Berane, Montenegro

Information
- Denomination: Eastern Orthodox
- Sui iuris church: Serbian Orthodox Church
- Established: 1219
- Cathedral: Saint Basil of Ostrog Cathedral, Nikšić
- Language: Church Slavonic, Serbian

Current leadership
- Bishop: Metodije Ostojić

Map

Website
- Eparchy of Budimlja and Nikšić

The Eparchy of Budimlja and Nikšić (Serbian: Епархија будимљанско-никшићка, romanized: Eparhija budimljansko-nikšićka) is a diocese (eparchy) of the Serbian Orthodox Church, covering western and northeastern parts of Montenegro.

The episcopal see is located at the Saint Basil of Ostrog Cathedral, Nikšić. Its headquarters and bishop's residence are at the Đurđevi Stupovi Monastery in Berane.

== History ==
The Serbian Archbishopric was established in 1219 by Saint Sava. On that occasion, the region of Budimlja in the upper Lim Valley was detached from the old Eparchy of Ras and on that territory the new Eparchy of Budimlja was created, centered around Đurđevi Stupovi Monastery, previously founded by Stefan Prvoslav, cousin of Saint Sava.

In 1346, the Serbian Archbishopric was raised to the rank of patriarchate, and on the same occasion the Eparchy of Budimlja was raised to the honorary rank of metropolitanate. In the middle of the 15th century, during the Ottoman conquest, several dioceses of the Serbian Orthodox Church suffered great devastation, including the Eparchy of Budimlja. The Serbian Patriarchate was renewed in 1557 by patriarch Makarije Sokolović, with the Eparchy of Budimlja remaining under its jurisdiction.

During the Great Turkish War relations between Ottoman authorities and their Serbian subjects deteriorated further. As a result of Ottoman oppression and destruction of churches and monasteries, Serbian Christians and their church leaders, headed by Serbian Patriarch Arsenije III, sided with the Austrians in 1689 and again in 1737 under Serbian Patriarch Arsenije IV. In the following punitive campaigns, the Ottoman armies conducted systematic atrocities against local Christian population in Serbian regions, including the region of Budimlja, resulting in Great Migrations of the Serbs. By that time, the Eparchy of Budimlja was abolished, and its territory incorporated into neighboring eparchies.

In 1938, the historical title of bishops of Budimlja was renewed for auxiliary bishops, and the diocese itself was re-established in 2001 as the Eparchy of Budimlja and Nikšić.

== List of bishops ==
=== Bishops of Budimlja ===
- Jakov (13th century)
- Kalinik (13th century)
- Teofil (1251–1252)
- Spiridon (13th century)
- German I (13th century)
- Neofit (13th century)
- German II (1292–1309)
- Nikola (1318)
- Vasilije I
- Makarije I
- Makarije II
- Sava (14th century)
- Vasilije II (1532)
- Matej (1552)
- Genadije (1559)
- Gerasim
- Teofil (1615)
- Grigorije
- Jeftimije
- Pajsije Kolašinović (1639–1654)
- Jefrem (1709)
- Jeftimije Damjanović (1725–1737)

=== Vicar bishops of Budimlja ===
- Nikolaj Jovanović (1938–1939)
- Joanikije Lipovac (1939–1941)
- Valerijan Stefanović (1941–1947)

=== Vicar bishops of Budimlja and Lim ===
- Makarije Đorđević (1947–1956)
- Andrej Frušić (1959–1961)
- Joanikije Mićović (1999–2001)

=== Bishops of Budimlja and Nikšić ===
- Joanikije Mićović (2001–2021)
- Metodije Ostojić (2021–present)

== Notable monasteries ==
- Đurđevi Stupovi
- Piva
- Dobrilovina
- Majstorovina
- Podmalinsko
- Bijela

== Gallery ==
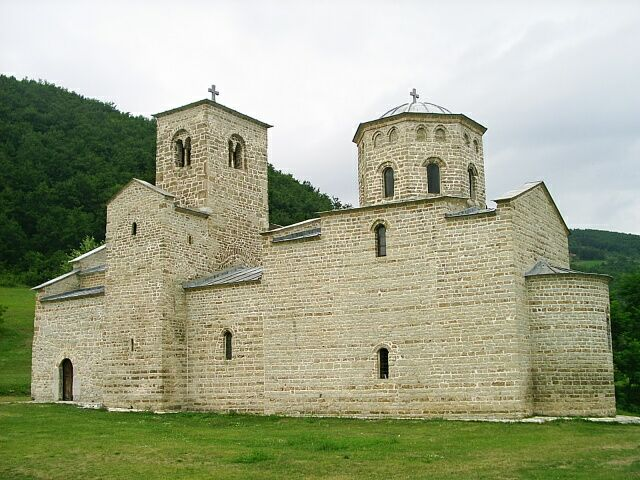
Đurđevi Stupovi Monastery (Berane)

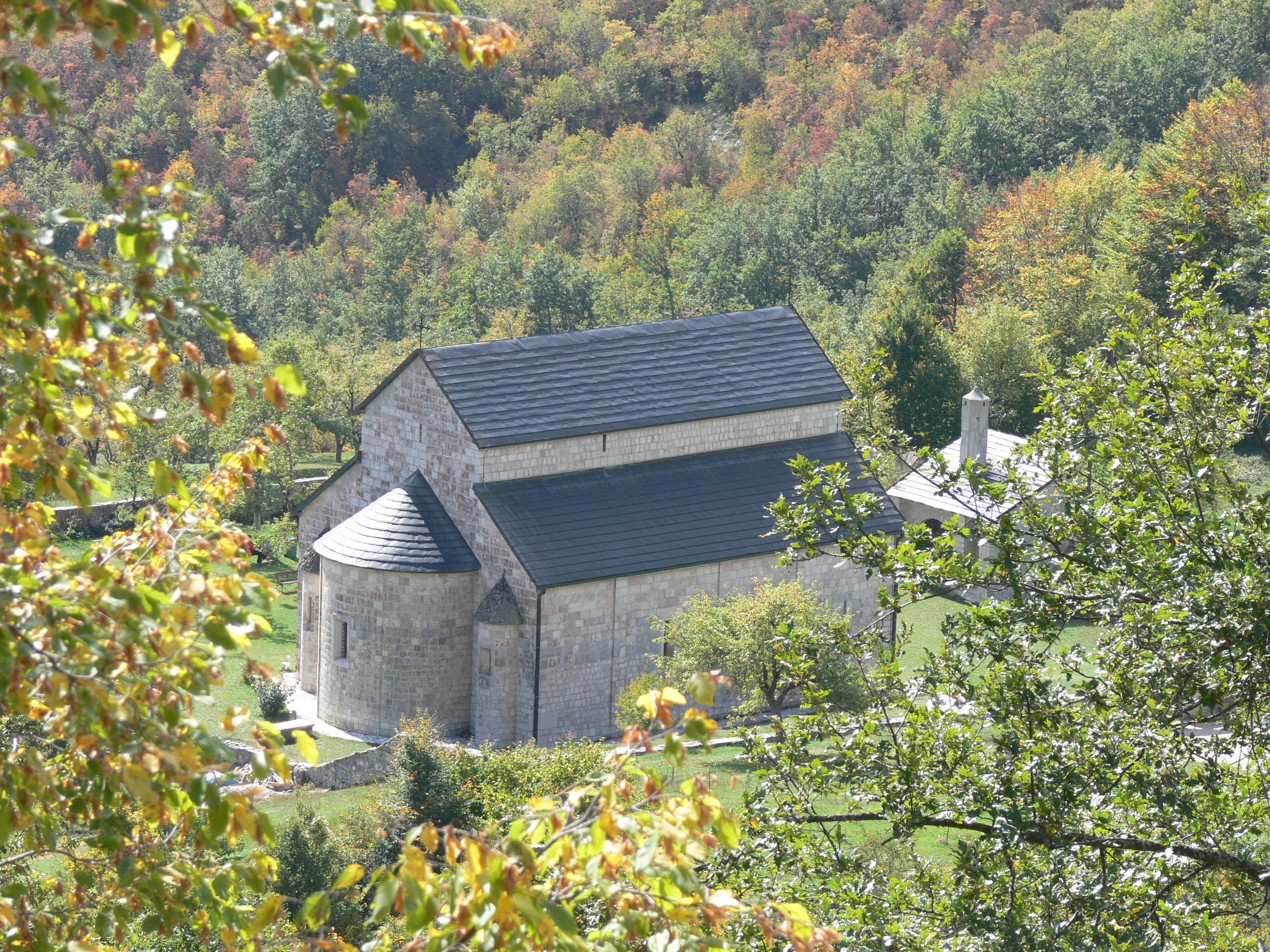
Piva Monastery
(near Plužine)

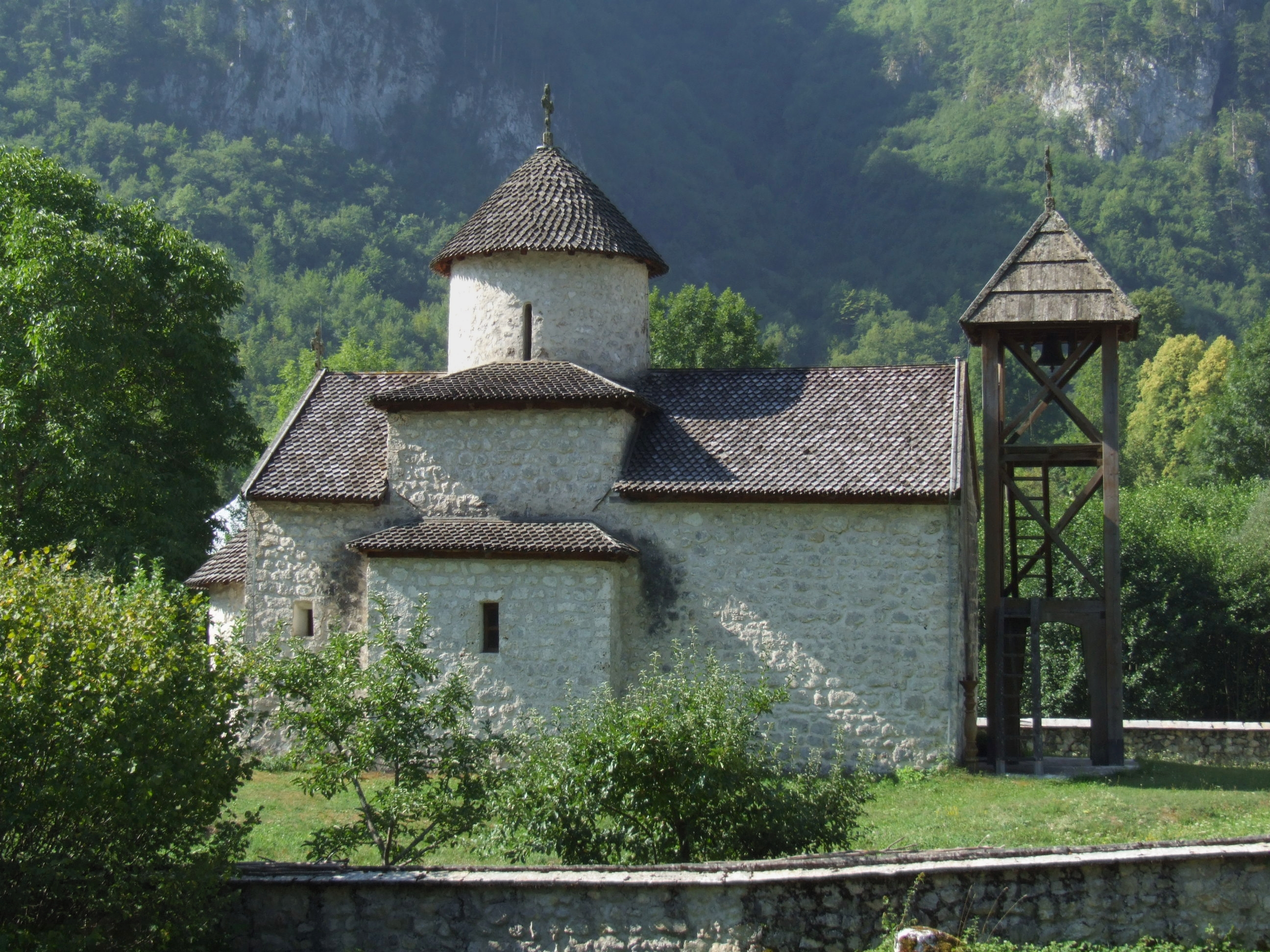
Dobrilovina Monastery (near Mojkovac)

== See also ==
- Eparchies and metropolitanates of the Serbian Orthodox Church
- Eastern Orthodoxy in Montenegro

== Bibliography ==
- Ćirković, Sima (2004). The Serbs. Malden: Blackwell Publishing. ISBN 9781405142915.
- Јанковић, Марија (1985). Епископије и митрополије Српске цркве у средњем веку (Bishoprics and Metropolitanates of Serbian Church in Middle Ages). Београд: Историјски институт САНУ.
- Pavlovich, Paul (1989). The History of the Serbian Orthodox Church. Serbian Heritage Books. ISBN 9780969133124.
- Pavlowitch, Stevan K. (2002). Serbia: The History Behind the Name. London: Hurst & Company.
- Popović, Svetlana (2002). "The Serbian Episcopal sees in the thirteenth century". Старинар (51: 2001): 171–184.
- Вуковић, Сава (1996). Српски јерарси од деветог до двадесетог века (Serbian Hierarchs from the 9th to the 20th Century). Евро, Унирекс, Каленић.
