= Kirilo Bojović =

Serbian Orthodox bishop (born 1969)

His Grace Kirilo (Bojović)
- Bishop
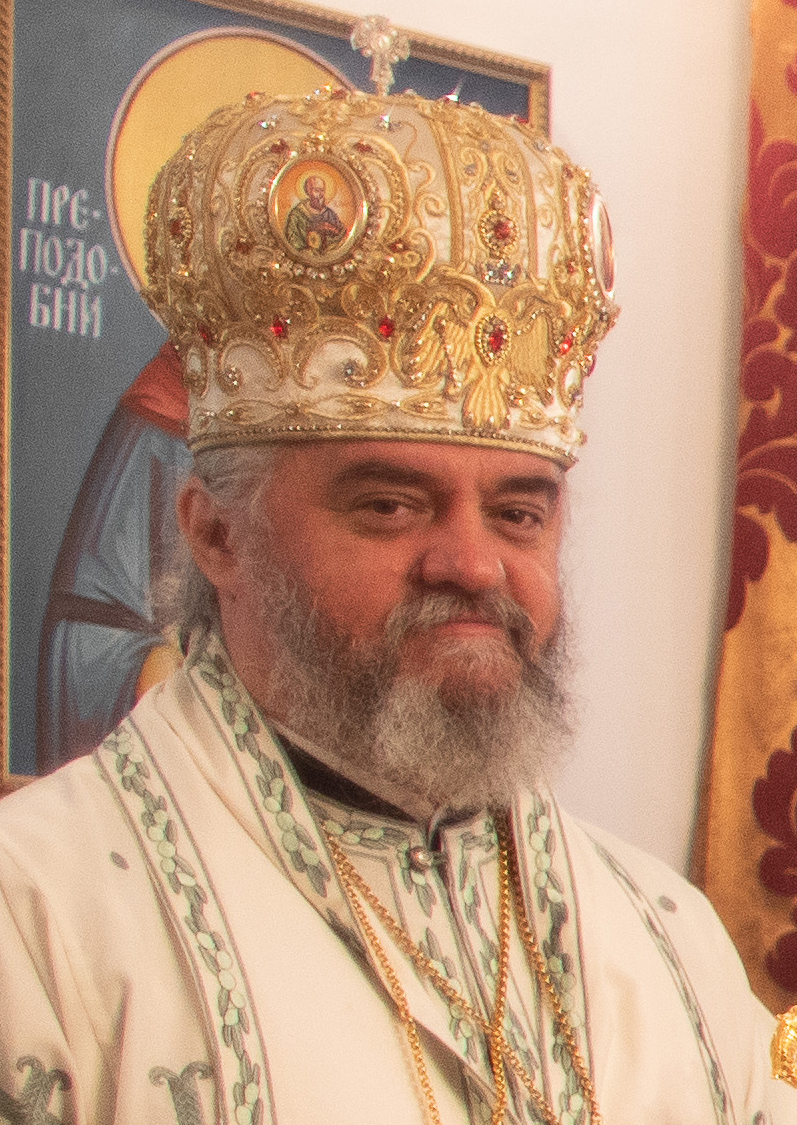
- Bishop Kirilo in 2019
- Church: Serbian Orthodox Church
- Diocese: Eparchy of Buenos Aires and South America
- Appointed: 10 May 2018
- Installed: 2 September 2018
- Predecessor: Metropolitan Amfilohije (administrator)
- Previous post: Titular Bishop of Dioclea (2016–2018)

Orders
- Ordination: 11 July 2004
- Consecration: 31 July 2016

Personal details
- Born: Milan Bojović; 4 February 1969 (age 57) Titograd, SR Montenegro, SFR Yugoslavia
- Denomination: Orthodox Christian
- Residence: Buenos Aires, Argentina

Kirilo Bojović (Serbian Cyrillic: Кирило Бојовић; 4 February 1969) is the ruling bishop of the Serbian Orthodox Church abroad with parishes and missions throughout South and Central America, known as the Serbian Orthodox Eparchy of Buenos Aires and South America.

== Biography ==
He was born in Podgorica in Montenegro on 4 February 1969. He completed his mathematical studies in Danilograd, Podgorica and Cetinje, served in the military, and in 2005 traveled to Russia to study philosophy and theology at the prestigious Moscow Spiritual Academy. There he defended a doctoral dissertation on the theme: "Metropolitan Petar II Petrović-Njegoš as a Christian Philosopher". Upon his return to Montenegro, Metropolitan Amfilohije assigned Father Kiril various tasks: professor of the New Testament in the seminary, editor-in-chief of Svetigora, a monthly of the Serbian Orthodox Diocese of Montenegro, with worship in various monasteries. He also pursued post-graduate studies at the Faculty of Theology of the University of Belgrade. Kirilo, in addition to his native Serbian, speaks Russian, Spanish, English, Greek, and Latin.

In December 2014, Archimandrite Kirilo arrived in Argentina amid the pastoral visit of Metropolitan Amfilohije to Buenos Aires and South America, to fulfill the responsibility of replacing Vladika Amfilohije upon his return to Montenegro.

Then, in 2016, Archimandrite Kirilo was consecrated as a vicar bishop for the Diocese. And in 2018, he was ordained a diocesan bishop and became the new administrator of the diocese.

With the blessings of the late Patriarch Irinej and the late Metropolitan Amfilohije, Patriarch Porfirije installed Bishop Kirilo to the Serbian Orthodox Eparchy of Buenos Aires and South America.

In May 2023, Bishop Kirilo was named as new administrator of the Metropolitanate of Zagreb and Ljubljana.

== Personal life ==
Bojović and Boris Bojović, the disputed metropolitan of the Montenegrin Orthodox Church, are cousins. However, due to their religious divide, the two are not close.
