= Đurđevi Stupovi, Montenegro =

Serbian Orthodox monastery in Berane, Montenegro

Coordinates: 42°51′13″N 19°51′42″E

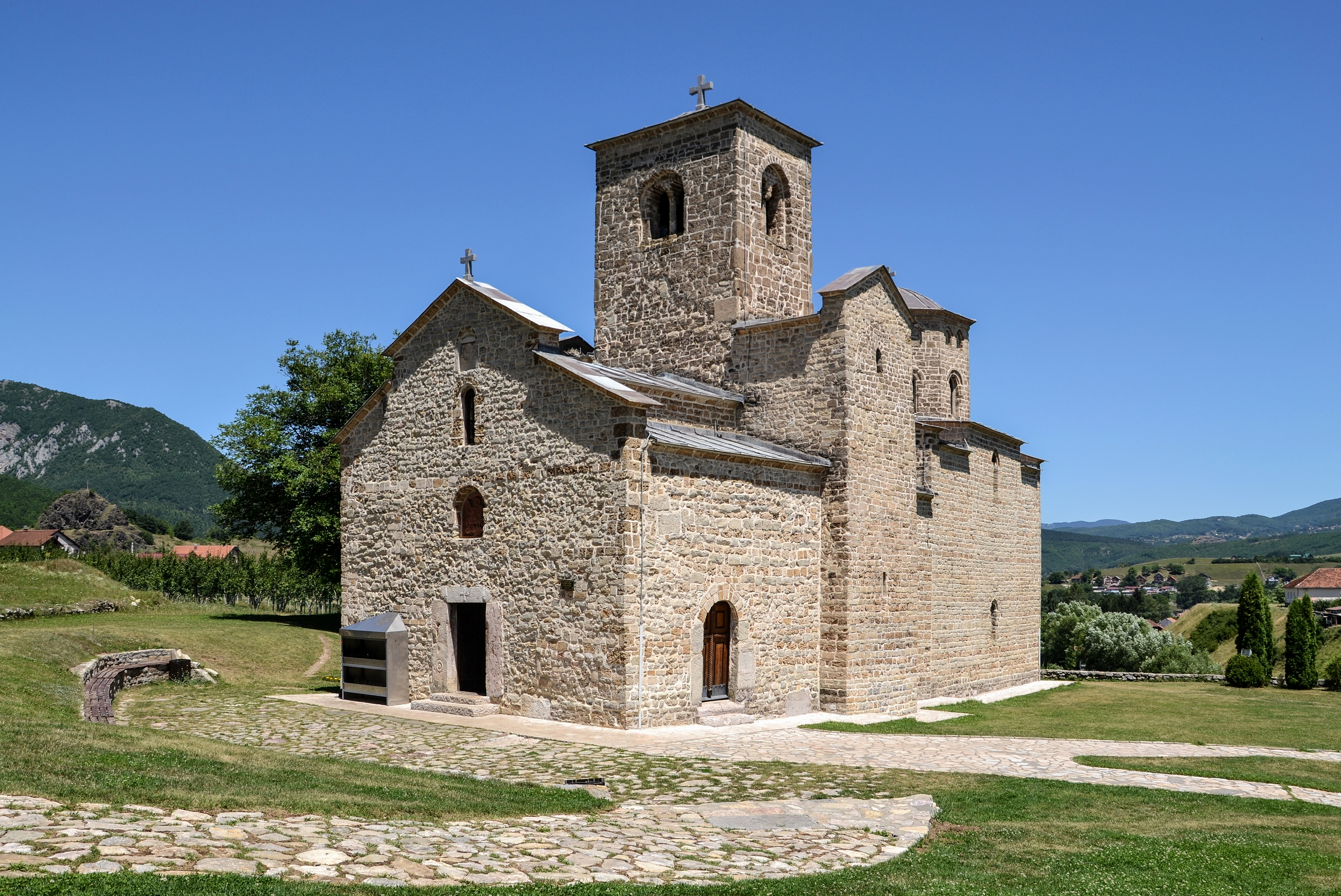
Monastery church

The Đurđevi Stupovi Monastery (Serbian: Манастир Ђурђеви ступови, romanized: Manastir Đurđevi stupovi, lit. "Monastery of the Pillars of St. George") is a Serbian Orthodox monastery in Berane, northeastern Montenegro. It was founded by Stefan Prvoslav, the nephew of Stefan Nemanja, in 1213. Since 1219, it was the seat of the Eparchy of Budimlja until the end of the 17th century. Nowadays, it is the seat of the Eparchy of Budimlja and Nikšić.

== See also ==
- List of Serbian Orthodox monasteries

== Sources ==
- Ćirković, Sima (2004). The Serbs. Malden: Blackwell Publishing.
- Јанковић, Марија (1985). Епископије и митрополије Српске цркве у средњем веку (Bishoprics and Metropolitanates of Serbian Church in Middle Ages). Београд: Историјски институт САНУ.
- Pavlovich, Paul (1989). The History of the Serbian Orthodox Church. Serbian Heritage Books.
- Pavlowitch, Stevan K. (2002). Serbia: The History Behind the Name. London: Hurst & Company.
- Popović, Svetlana (2002). "The Serbian Episcopal sees in the thirteenth century". Старинар (51: 2001): 171–184.
- Вуковић, Сава (1996). Српски јерарси од деветог до двадесетог века (Serbian Hierarchs from the 9th to the 20th Century). Евро, Унирекс, Каленић.
