= Irinej Bulović =

Serbian Orthodox bishop

His Eminence Irinej
- Bishop of Bačka
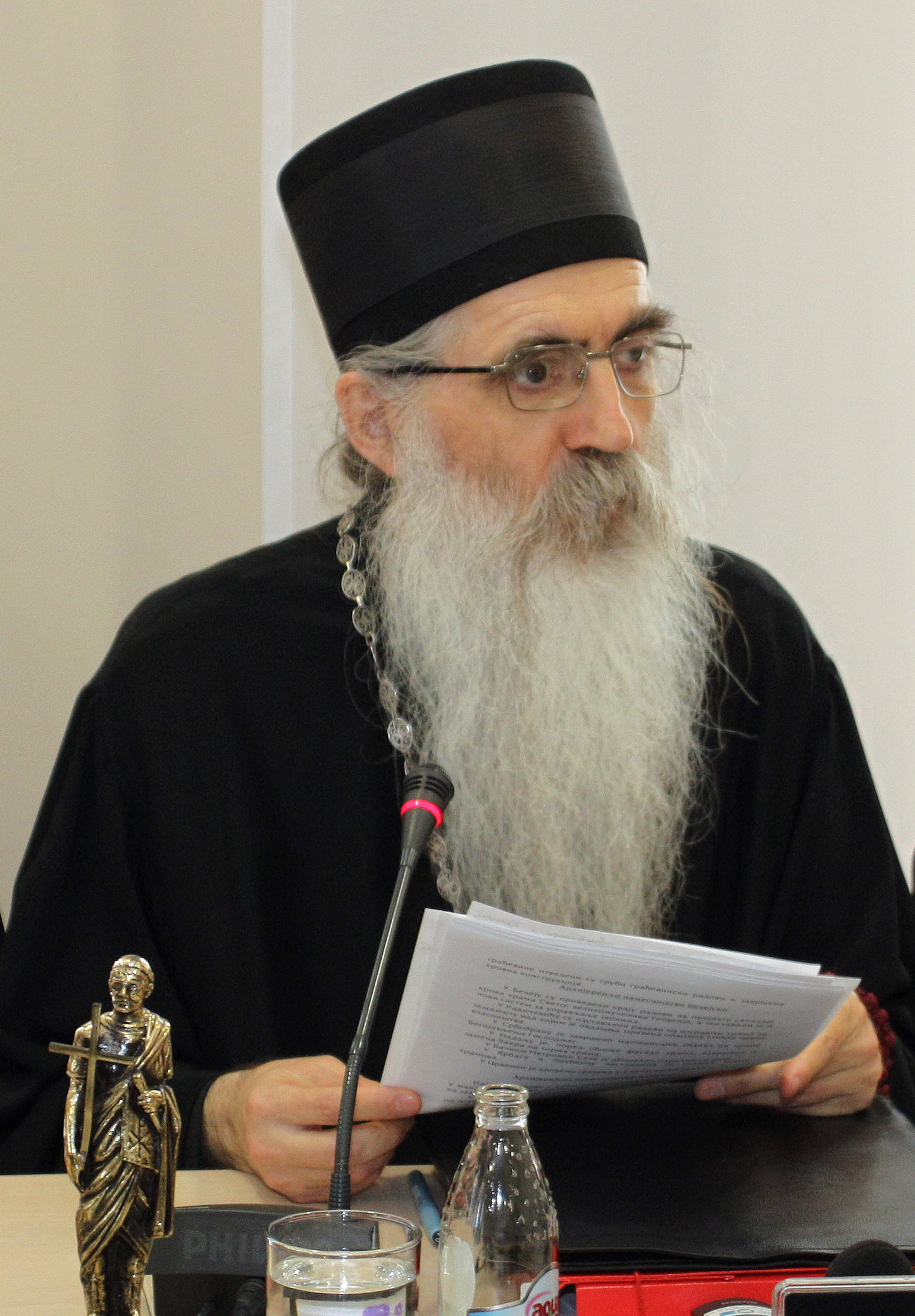
- Bishop Irinej in 2012
- Native name: Иринеј
- Church: Serbian Orthodox Church
- Diocese: Eparchy of Bačka
- Elected: 20 May 1990
- Installed: 24 December 1990
- Predecessor: Nikanor (Iličić)
- Previous post: Vicar Bishop of Moravica (1989–1990)

Personal details
- Born: Mirko Bulović; 11 February 1947 (age 79) Stanišić, PR Serbia, FPR Yugoslavia
- Denomination: Serbian Orthodox
- Residence: Kovilj (Novi Sad)
- Profession: theologian
- Education: Faculty of Theology of the University of Belgrade; Faculty of Theology of the University of Athens

Ordination history of Irinej Bulović
History
Diaconal ordination
- Ordained by: Pavle, bishop of Raška and Prizren
Priestly ordination
- Ordained by: Pavle, bishop of Raška and Prizren

Irinej Bulović (born Mirko Bulović; 11 February 1947) is a Serbian Orthodox cleric who was elected Bishop of Bačka in 1990. He serves as a professor of the New Testament exegesis and Greek language on the Faculty of Theology of the University of Belgrade.

== Biography ==
Bulović was born as Mirko to parents Mihailo and Zorka on 11 February 1947, in Stanišić near Sombor in Serbia (then FPR Yugoslavia). He graduated from the Faculty of Theology in Belgrade in 1969. While a student, he took monastic vows from his mentor Justin Popović and then took monastic name of Irinej (Irenaeus). In 1969, Pavle, then bishop of Raška and Prizren (later Serbian Patriarch) ordained Bulović as hierodeacon and later hieromonk. For two years (1969–1970) he lived in the Ostrog Monastery where he was a teacher in the monastic school. He completed his post-graduate studies in 1970–1980 at the School of Theology of the University of Athens, Greece, where he gained the doctor of theology degree in June 1980. In 1981, he was appointed a professor of the New Testament exegesis on the Faculty of Theology in Belgrade, a position he still holds as of 2014.

During the regular session of the Holy Synod of the Serbian Orthodox Church in 1989, Irinej Bulović was elected a Vicar Bishop of Moravica, and in 1990 he was elected Bishop of Bačka and enthroned in the Saint George's Cathedral in Novi Sad on 24 December 1990.

He repeatedly attends international ecumenical meetings and is a recognized ecumenical worker.

When Patriarch Irinej fell ill, he was seen as one of the main candidates for position of the next patriarch.

In 2026, he was awarded the Sretenje Order.

Eastern Orthodox Church titles
Preceded by Nikanor Iličić	Bishop of Bačka; 1990–present	Incumbent
Preceded by Longin Krčo	Vicar Bishop of Moravica; 1989–1990	Succeeded by Antonije Pantelić
