= Cathedral of the Resurrection of Christ, Podgorica =

Serbian Orthodox cathedral in Podgorica, Montenegro

Cathedral of the Resurrection of Christ
- Cathedral of the Resurrection of Christ, pictured in 2015

Religion
- Affiliation: Serbian Orthodox Church
- District: Metropolitanate of Montenegro and the Littoral
- Year consecrated: 2013

Location
- Location: Podgorica, Montenegro
- Interactive map of Cathedral of the Resurrection of Christ
- Coordinates: 42°26′44.5″N 19°14′53.7″E

Architecture
- Architects: Predrag Ristić; Jovan Popović
- Completed: 2013
- Height (max): 41.5

Website
- hramvaskrsenja.me

The Cathedral of the Resurrection of Christ (Serbian: Саборни храм Христовог Васкрсења, romanized: Saborni hram Hristovog Vaskrsenja) is an Eastern Orthodox church located in Podgorica, Montenegro. It is under jurisdiction of the Metropolitanate of Montenegro and the Littoral of the Serbian Orthodox Church and serves as its cathedral church.

== History ==
Construction of the church of around 14,000 square feet began in 1993 to a design by Predrag Ristić. Consecration occurred in 2013, on the occasion of the 1700th anniversary of the Edict of Milan on freedom of religion, and it was attended by the heads of the Eastern Orthodox Churches, Serbian Patriarch Irinej, Ecumenical Patriarch Bartholomew, Jerusalem Patriarch Theophilus III and Russian Patriarch Cyril, together with Metropolitan of Montenegro and the Littoral Amfilohije Radović and other Metropolitanate clerics.

Amfilohije Radović, who had served as Metropolitan of Montenegro and the Littoral for the thirty years (1990–2020), was buried, at his own request, in the cathedral's crypt in 2020.

== Architecture ==
The "Orthodox Arts Journal" writes that the cathedral is "certainly one of the most interesting Orthodox churches built in our times. Unlike other new cathedrals we have seen recently, the exterior does not seek to reflect High-Byzantine perfection. Rather, it is a charmingly eccentric design. It has the slightly awkward qualities of any real cathedral, expressing the cultural tensions between the high Imperial style and the capabilities of local craftsmen." The church, with its twin towers and prominent arch is clearly influenced by the medieval Cathedral of St. Tryphon, with Romanesque, Italianate, and Byzantine influences. The interior is heavily adorned with iconographic murals with gold backgrounds, marble floors and furnishings.

=== Gallery ===
Cathedral

Cathedral dome

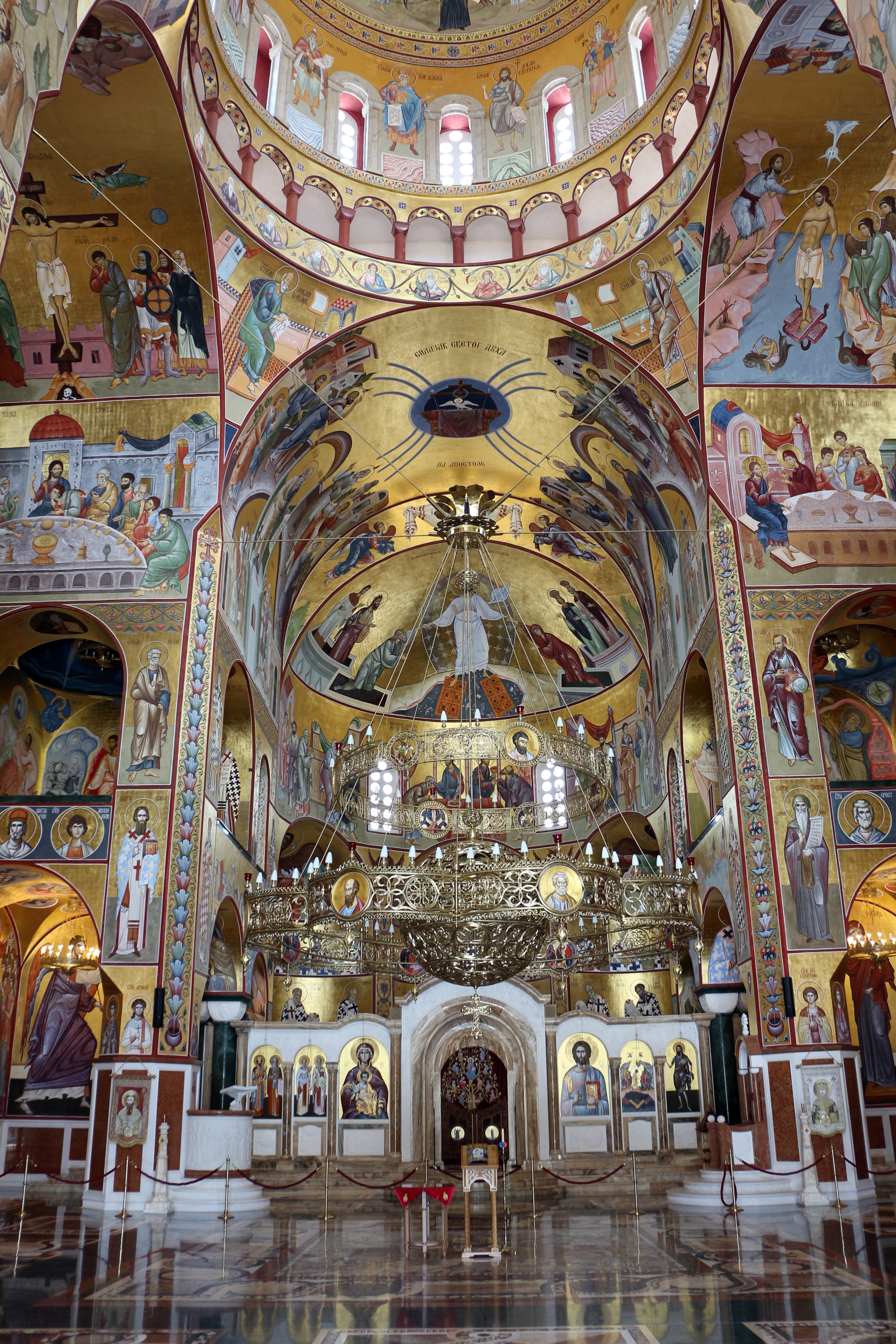
Interior

Tomb of metropolitan Amfilohije Radović at the crypt

== See also ==
- List of cathedrals in Montenegro
