= St. Sava Church =

St. Sava Church, Saint Sava Church, St. Sava Serbian Orthodox Church, Saint Sava Serbian Orthodox Church, Saint Sava Serbian Orthodox Cathedral, is a commonly used name for specific churches within the Serbian Orthodox Church.

Notable uses of the term may refer to:

== Europe ==
- Church of Saint Sava (Belgrade, Serbia)
- Church of Saint Sava (Mitrovica, Kosovo)
- Saint Sava Serbian Orthodox Cathedral (Paris, France)
- Saint Sava Serbian Orthodox Cathedral (Stockholm, Sweden)
- Saint Sava Serbian Orthodox Cathedral (London, United Kingdom)

== United States ==
- Saint Sava Church (Douglas, Alaska)
- Saint Sava Serbian Orthodox Church (Phoenix, Arizona)
- Saint Sava Serbian Orthodox Church (Jackson, California)
- Saint Sava Serbian Orthodox Church (North Port, Florida)
- Saint Sava Serbian Orthodox Church (St. Petersburg, Florida)
- Saint Sava Serbian Orthodox Church (Joliet, Illinois)
- Saint Sava Serbian Orthodox Monastery (Libertyville, Illinois)
- Saint Sava Serbian Orthodox Church (Merrillville, Indiana)
- Saint Sava Serbian Orthodox Church (Cambridge, Massachusetts)
- Saint Sava Serbian Orthodox Church (Saint Paul, Minnesota)
- Saint Sava Serbian Orthodox Church (New York City, New York)
- Saint Sava Serbian Orthodox Church (Broadview Heights, Ohio)
- Saint Sava Serbian Orthodox Church (Parma, Ohio)
- Saint Sava Serbian Orthodox Church (McKeesport, Pennsylvania)
- Saint Sava Serbian Orthodox Church (Pittsburgh, Pennsylvania)
- Saint Sava Serbian Orthodox Church (Cypress, Texas)
- Saint Sava Serbian Orthodox Church (Issaquah, Washington)
- Saint Sava Serbian Orthodox Church (Milwaukee, Wisconsin)

== Canada ==
- Saint Sava Serbian Orthodox Church (Edmonton, Alberta)
- Saint Sava Serbian Orthodox Church (Vancouver, British Columbia)
- Saint Sava Serbian Orthodox Church (Winnipeg, Manitoba)
- Saint Sava Serbian Orthodox Church (London, Ontario)
- Saint Sava Serbian Orthodox Church (Toronto, Ontario)

== Australia ==
- Saint Sava - New Kalenich Serbian Orthodox Monastery (Wallaroo, New South Wales)
- Saint Sava Serbian Orthodox Monastery (Elaine, Victoria)
