= Saint Michael the Archangel Serbian Orthodox Church (Toronto) =

Coordinates: 43.661868°N 79.428467°W

Saint Michael the Archangel Church
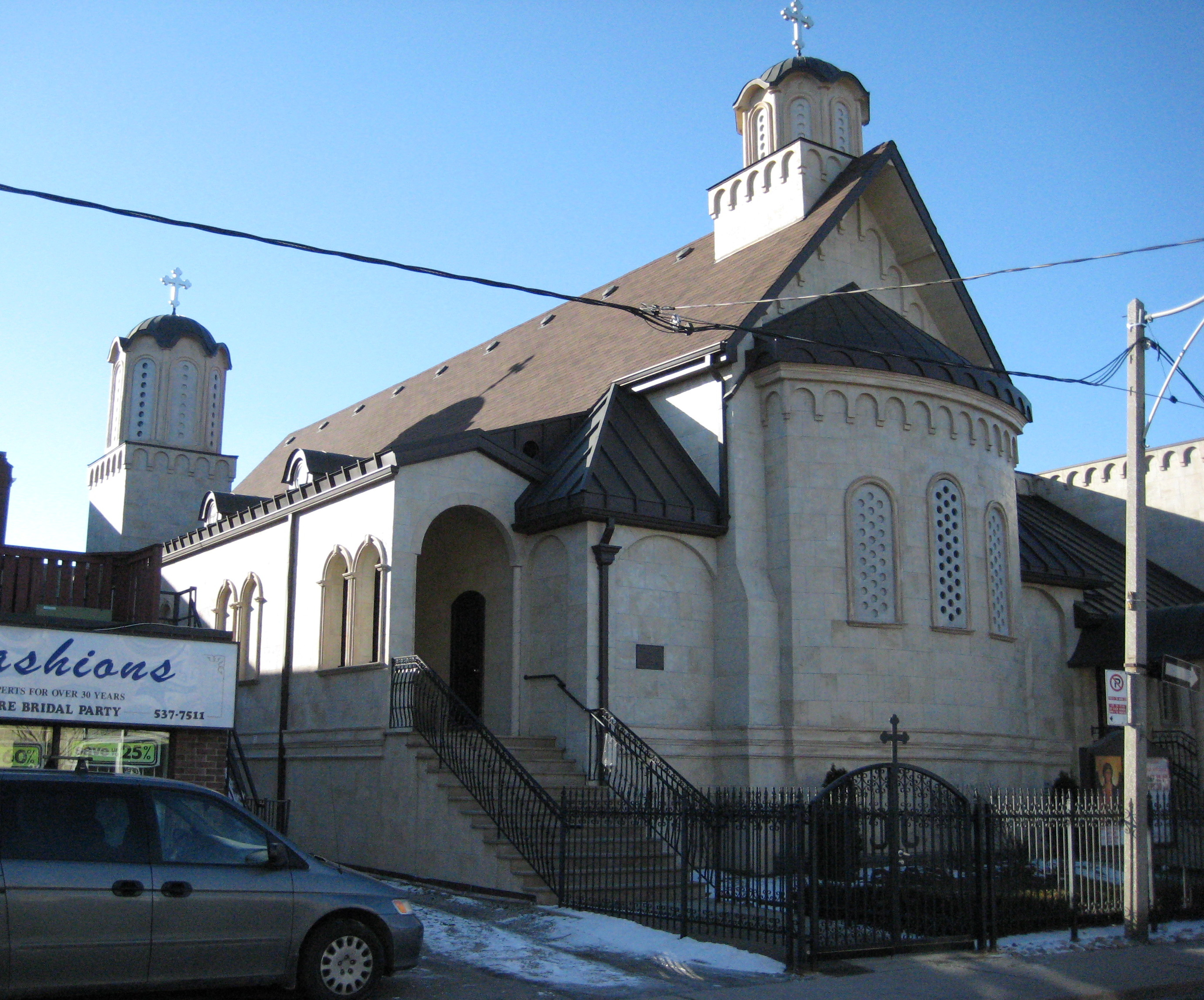
- The church pictured in 2010
- Saint Michael the Archangel Church
- Location: 212 Delaware Avenue; Toronto, Ontario; M6H 2T7
- Denomination: Independent Eastern Orthodox
- Website: www.starchangeltoronto.com

History
- Former name: St. Mary the Virgin Anglican Church (1889–1914)
- Consecrated: November 28, 1965; 60 years ago

Architecture
- Architect(s): Langley & Burke
- Architectural type: Serbo-Byzantine Revival
- Years built: 1888–1889

Clergy
- Priest: Ab. Sofronije Nikić

Saint Michael the Archangel Serbian Eastern Orthodox Church (Serbian: Српска православна црква Светог Архангела Михаила) in Toronto, Ontario, Canada is a Serbian Eastern Orthodox church which is not a member of the Serbian Orthodox Church due to a tumultuous history (though at one time it was).

The church structure was originally built in 1889 as an Anglican church and was used by the Anglicans until 1914. Today, the church building stylistically synthesizes Serbian late-Byzantine architectural-styles and icon styles with many copper domes, cupolas and trim.

The church is located on the north-west corner of Bloor Street West and Delaware Avenue in Dovercourt Park just across the street from Ossington station.

== History ==
=== As an Orthodox church ===
Distraught that the Patriarch of the Serbian Orthodox Church German had relations with the League of Communists of Yugoslavia, followers of the Bishop of America and Canada Dionisije (Milivojević) began to organize themselves in all free and democratic countries and to establish separate parishes and build new churches, splitting from the Patriarchate of the Serbian Orthodox Church in Belgrade and forming the Free Serbian Orthodox Church. This division (known in modern historiography as the American schism) also occurred in Toronto with the establishment of the newly founded parish of Saint Michael the Archangel, which split from the Saint Sava Church and School Congregation.

The newly founded Saint Michael the Archangel Church and School Congregation had 700 members at its first founding assembly. Initially, services were held in the Ukrainian Hall on Christie Street, but it was soon decided to purchase the old Anglican church on Delaware Avenue, with the Serbs of Toronto purchasing it on June 14, 1964. After the purchase of the church, the interior underwent a necessary renovation so that it could be used for Orthodox services as soon as possible. The act of consecration of the church was performed by Bishop Dionisije on November 28, 1965.

In 1983, the church community established a library, containing one thousand books, named after Bishop Dionisije.

The American schism lasted until 1992, when the newly-appointed Patriarch Pavle visited North America and returned the church (which belonged to the canonical Eparchy for America and Canada) to full communion with the Patriarchate in Belgrade. Patriarch Pavle presided over a doxology at the Saint Michael the Archangel Church in Toronto on October 20, 1992, concelebrated by Metropolitan Irinej (Kovačević) of New Gračanica and Bishop Stefan (Boca) of Žiča.

In June 2009, the Serbian Orthodox Church in North and South America underwent reorganizing, transferring the Saint Michael the Archangel Church from the Eparchy for America and Canada to the Eparchy of Canada. Members of the Saint Michael the Archangel Church and School Congregation objected and as a result of this internal conflict, the parish was transferred out of the Serbian Orthodox jurisdiction and over to the non-canonical jurisdiction of the Orthodox Church of Greece (Holy Synod in Resistance) under the Archdiocese of Etna (California). The first Divine Liturgy under the new jurisdiction was on April 11, 2010. In 2014, the Holy Synod in Resistance united itself with the Church of the Genuine Orthodox Christians of Greece and formally ceased to exist which transferred the parish over to the Metropolis of the Genuine Greek Orthodox Church of America (Greek Old Calendarists).

Since 2015, the parish is not part of any diocese and has been registered as a corporation. It is still sometimes referred to as a Free Serbian Orthodox Church.

== See also ==
- Serbian Orthodox Church in North and South America
- Saint Sava Serbian Orthodox Church (Toronto)
- Serbian Canadians
