= Saint Arsenije Sremac Serbian Orthodox Church =

Serbian Orthodox church in Whitby, Ontario

Coordinates: 43°52′28.4″N 78°56′30.1″W

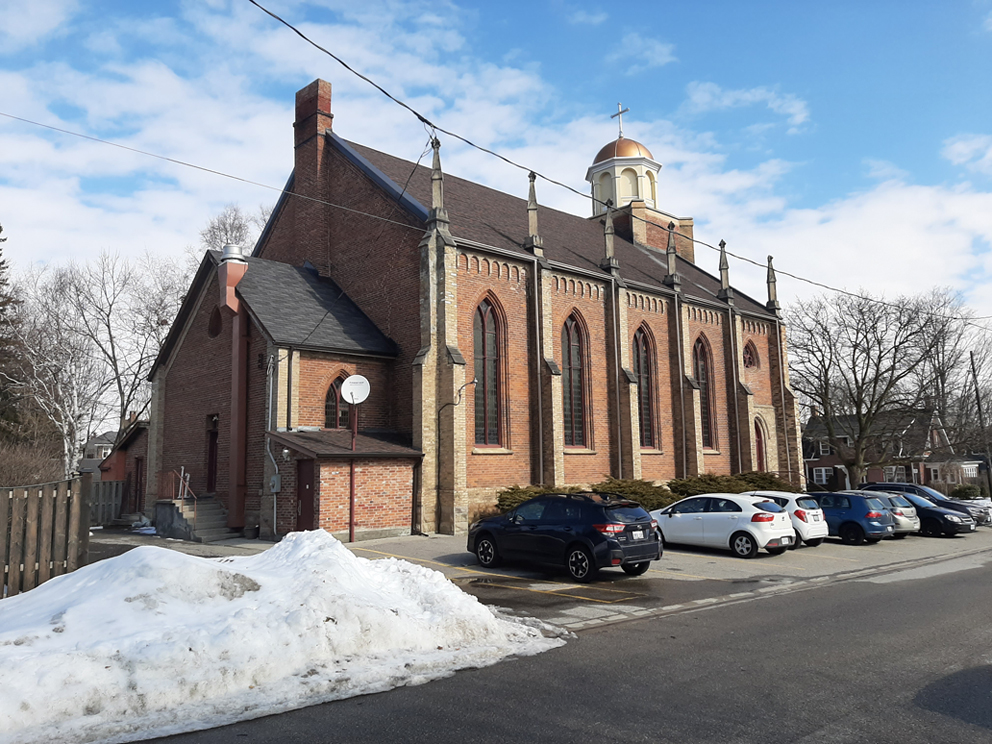
- Saint Arsenije Sremac Serbian Orthodox Church, pictured in 2020
- Saint Arsenije Sremac Serbian Orthodox Church
- Location: 508 Byron Street South; Whitby, Ontario; L1N 4R3
- Denomination: Serbian Orthodox Church
- Website: starsenijesremac.com

History
- Consecrated: October 9, 1993; 33 years ago

Architecture
- Architect: Amos W. Cron
- Architectural type: Gothic Revival
- Years built: 1857–1859

Administration
- Diocese: Serbian Orthodox Eparchy of Canada

Clergy
- Priest: Fr. Petar Marjanović

Saint Arsenije Sremac Serbian Orthodox Church (Serbian: Српска православна црква Светог Арсенија Сремца, romanized: Srpska pravoslavna crkva Svetog Arsenija Sremca) is an Eastern Orthodox church located in Whitby, Ontario, Canada. It is under jurisdiction of the Serbian Orthodox Eparchy of Canada of the Serbian Orthodox Church and is dedicated to Saint Arsenije Sremac, the second Archbishop of the Serbian Orthodox Church and a disciple of Saint Sava. It contains one parish which reaches the far east parts of the Greater Toronto Area: Scarborough, Pickering, Ajax, Whitby, Oshawa, Clarington, Peterborough, Cobourg, Belleville up to and including Kingston. The church is registered by the Town of Whitby and the Ontario Heritage Trust as a heritage building since 1996.

== History ==
=== Presbyterian church (1859–1968) ===
The original church building was the St. Andrew's Presbyterian Church built from 1857 to 1859. Built in the Gothic Revival architectural style, it was designed as a Scottish kirk by Whitby architect Amos W. Cron. Local grain merchant William Laing paid for the site and half the construction costs. It was built as a brick load-bearing cathedral with a central tower. The face carved over the front door is that of John Knox, the founder of Presbyterianism. The church was used by the Presbyterians until 1968 when the new St. Andrew's Presbyterian Church opened at 209 Cochrane Street. The house located next door (built in 1956) at 506 Byron Street South used to be the St. Andrew's Presbyterian Manse.

=== Оther denominations (1968–1993) ===
During this time period, the church building was home to a number of denominations including the Church of the Way and the Byron Baptist Church.

=== Serbian Orthodox church (1993–present) ===
In December 1969, the Bishop of Eastern America and Canada Sava (Vuković) – as requested of him by a number of residents of Oshawa – gave his blessing for the formation of a Church and School Congregation to be named after Saint Arsenije Sremac. A number of Serbian Canadian enthusiasts began the attempt to form a membership for the Church and School Congregation. As they didn't have the means to support a full-time priest, missionary priests would from time to time come to serve the Holy Liturgy in a rented Greek Orthodox church located at 261 Bloor Street East in Oshawa. This continued until the 1980s when the Church and School Congregation was closed and transferred over to the Saint Sava Serbian Orthodox Church and School Congregation of Toronto.

With the formation of the Serbian Orthodox Eparchy of Canada and the instalment of its first bishop Georgije (Đokić), there was again a wish to renew Serbian Orthodox church life in Oshawa and its surrounding regions. At the annual diocesan meeting in Hamilton on February 5, 1993, approval was given to form the Saint Arsenije Sremac Serbian Orthodox Church and School Congregation in its current borders. On the same day, the Diocesan Council and Diocesan Court announced the decision to formally make this Church and School Congregation.

Immediately upon forming the church community, it was decided to buy the former Presbyterian church located at 508 Byron Street South on the intersection of St John Street West in downtown Whitby. In early May 1993, the church was purchased for $285,000 and was transferred on June 11, 1993. The church was consecrated on October 9, 1993 by Bishop Georgije. Before the consecration, the church interior was re-ordered for Orthodox usage. After the arrival of a full-time priest, the iconostasis was made by iconographer Dragomir "Dragan" Marunić. An altar was made along with two choir stands, a church store and places for candles and icons. After that, with the donations of parishioners, everything else needed for an Orthodox church was ordered and purchased. The main noticeable remnants of the previous owners are the stained glass windows.

The extra tier on the church steeple (crowned with finials) was replaced by a golden cupola which was installed in 2012. On the eve of the feast of the Three Holy Hierarchs, Patriarch Irinej visited the church in 2016 and blessed an icon of Saint Arsenije Sremac which is done on canvas and mounted above the doors of the church nave.

The Nativity of Mary Circle of Serbian Sisters also operates at the church. Through their initiative, funds were raised for the construction of a woodcut Тomb of Christ, which was installed and consecrated in 2025. A church library was established in March 2026.

== See also ==
- Serbian Orthodox Eparchy of Canada
- Serbian Orthodox Church in North and South America
- Serbian Canadians

== Notes ==
1. Now the Saint Stephen the Great and Saint Nektarios Romanian Orthodox Church.
