= Saints Peter and Paul Serbian Orthodox Church (Sudbury) =

Serbian Orthodox church in Sudbury, Ontario

Coordinates: 46.5045°N 81.0022°W

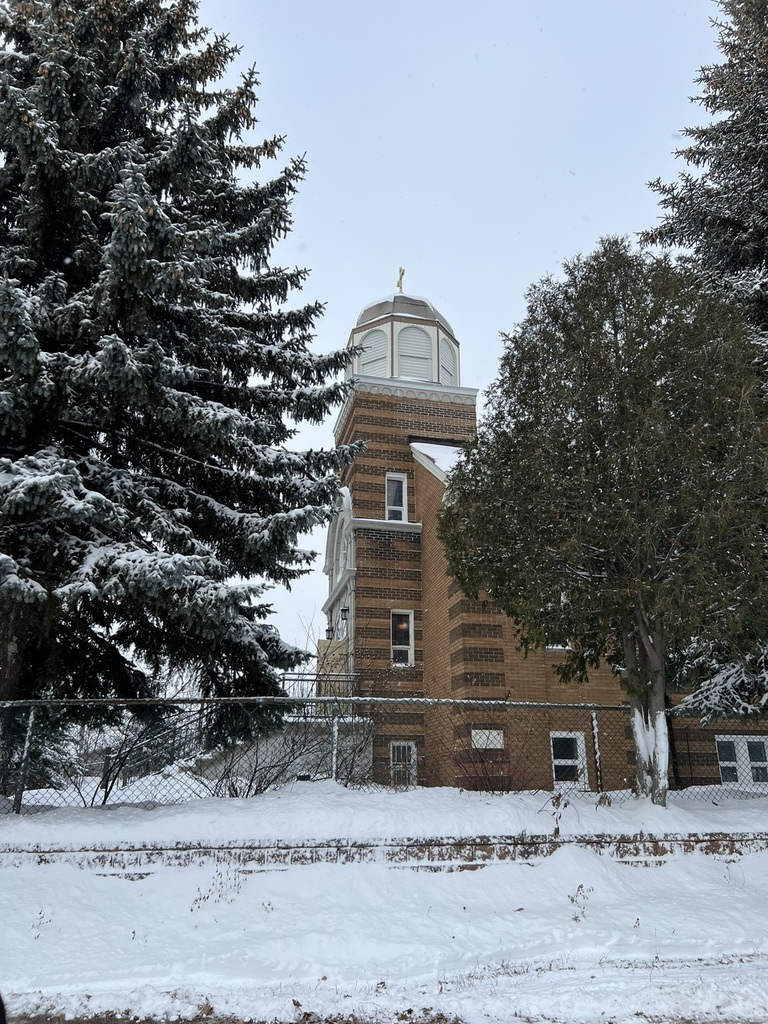
- Saints Peter and Paul Serbian Orthodox Church
- Saints Peter and Paul Serbian Orthodox Church
- Location: 515 Antwerp Street; Sudbury, Ontario; P3C 4M9
- Denomination: Serbian Orthodox Church
- Website: sudburyorthodox.ca

History
- Consecrated: June 27, 1964

Architecture
- Architectural type: Serbo-Byzantine Revival
- Years built: 1963–1964

Administration
- Diocese: Serbian Orthodox Eparchy of Canada

Clergy
- Priest: Fr. Brian Payne

Saints Peter and Paul Serbian Orthodox Church (Serbian: Црква Светих апостола Петра и Павла у Садберију, romanized: Crkva Svetih apostola Petra i Pavla u Sadberiju) is an Eastern Orthodox church located in the neighbourhood of The Donovan in Sudbury, Ontario, Canada. It is under jurisdiction of the Serbian Orthodox Eparchy of Canada of the Serbian Orthodox Church and is dedicated to Saints Peter and Paul.

== History ==
The church was built from 1963 to 1964, when about 500 Serbian families lived in Sudbury, many of whom worked in the Sudbury mines. The consecration of the church was performed by Bishop Dionisije on June 27, 1964. The church was under the jurisdiction of the Free Serbian Orthodox Church until 1992, when the reconciliation process began. Formal unification took place on May 21, 2009, when, by decision of the Holy Council of Bishops, all parishes in Canada were transferred under the omophorion of the Serbian Orthodox Eparchy of Canada.

The number of Serbian families in Sudbury who attend the parish has dropped to about 50 as many have moved to Toronto and Chicago where there are larger Serbian communities. The church also used to own and operate the Serbian Hall on 231 Bloor Street which is now the Berean Baptist Church.

== See also ==
- Serbian Orthodox Eparchy of Canada
- Serbian Orthodox Church in North and South America
- Serbian Canadians
