= Holy Trinity Serbian Orthodox Church (Regina) =

Serbian Orthodox church in Regina, Saskatchewan

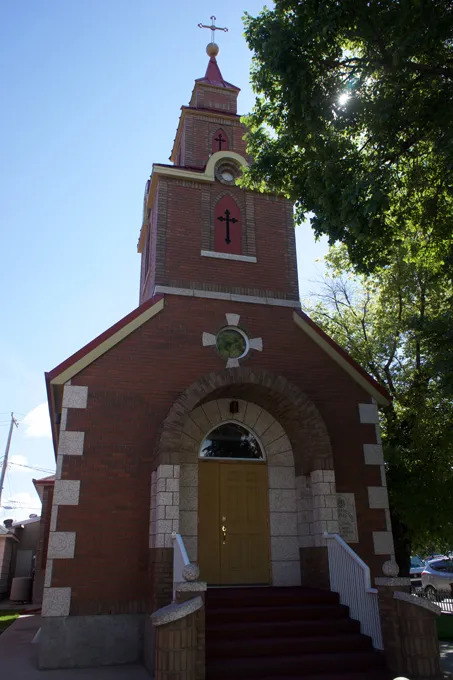
- Holy Trinity Serbian Orthodox Church
- Location: 928 11th Avenue; Regina, Saskatchewan; S4N 0K7
- Denomination: Serbian Orthodox Church

History
- Consecrated: May 14, 1916; 110 years ago

Architecture
- Years built: 1912–1916

Administration
- Diocese: Serbian Orthodox Eparchy of Canada

The Holy Trinity Serbian Orthodox Church (Serbian: Српски православни храм Свете Тројице, romanized: Srpski pravoslavni hram Svete Trojice) is an Eastern Orthodox church located in Regina, Saskatchewan, Canada. It is under the jurisdiction of the Serbian Orthodox Eparchy of Canada of the Serbian Orthodox Church. It holds the distinction of being the first Serbian church built in Canada, completed in 1916.

== History ==
The first Serbs to arrive in Saskatchewan came during the second wave of Serb emigration to Canada, between 1900 and 1914. They emigrated from the Austria-Hungary provinces of Croatia and Vojvodina, what once comprised the Military Frontier. In Saskatchewan they made their homestead in the Rural Municipality of McCraney No. 282 between the area of Kenaston and Bladworth while others settled in Truax, Avonlea and Claybank. There most of them took up farming. A few moved to different places in Canada and the United States, where they sought different type of work in more tolerable climates.

In 1912, those who remained in Regina and the area decided to establish a church-school congregation. The Serbians generally use the term "church-school congregation" everywhere in the diaspora where others might use "parish". The word "parish" has historical associations with Western ecclesiastical government, and the Serbs prefer to guard the Orthodox spiritual mentality. At the first organizational meeting, there were 48 persons present. They immediately began the process to build a Temple. Stevan and Sava Djurišić donated a lot at McAra street on which to build the future Temple. It should be noted, however, that the other families contributed as well for this major undertaking. Those families were: Inić, Jakovljev, Skerletov, Maksimović, Knežević, Petrov, Velemirov, Trifunov, Milanov, Matić, Stojadinov, Erdeljan, and others. They began the construction in 1911, and it was completed in 1912. The new temple was built in the 17th block of McAra Street in the eastern part of the city.

Soon Serbian activity swelled during the first two decades of the 20th century, triggered by politics of pre-World War I and its aftermath and the emancipation of at least 10 nations (including the Kingdom of Serbs, Croats, and Slovenes) that were formerly part of the Austrian Empire. In Canada, Serbs in the Maritimes, Québec, Ontario, the Prairies, British Columbia and the Northern territories of Yukon began agitating for change in British colonial policies towards their treatment of immigrants. The branding of anyone born in Austria-Hungary and Ottoman Empire with the stigma of "enemy aliens" became intolerable not only in Regina but elsewhere in the vast expanse of the Canadian Dominion. Hundreds of front-page headlines in newspapers spoke of the injustices resulting from the draconian measures imposed by Ottawa and London. In a speech in Regina War veteran Bud Protich raised the question of recognizing Serbs and Serbia as Empire's Allies.

With the war's end, the Regina Serbs gathered on 6 March 1919 to generously donate to the Saskatchewan Serbian Relief Committee after Helen Losanitch Frothingham paid a visit and spoke of the hardships in Serbia.

In 1925, nearly 500 people attended the Easter services at the little church on McAra street. Another significant year was 1933 when the church was moved 18 blocks away to 11th Avenue and Winnipeg Street. Two years later, a parish hall was constructed on the same site, next to the church.

The 50th Anniversary of the Holy Trinity Serbian Orthodox Church took place in 1966 with much pomp and circumstance and the publication of a commemorative book. But from then on church life seemed to wane in the 1970s until a sports centre under the auspices of the church was formed with diocesan approval. The parish rectory and residence for the Bishop in the same building was blessed on 29 October 1980 by Bishop Sava Vuković. On 6 August 1983 Bishop Christopher visited Regina for the first time with hopes of revitalizing the Church community. The parish was without a regular priest since 1968.

With the arrival of Rev. Mirko Malinović and new immigrants to Regina in 1985, the possibilities of church life renewal grew. Father Mirko paid heed to his duties as a parish priest, but most of all he conducted the parish educational program which was lacking at the time. He was assisted by the Church-School volunteer staff. Soon, a new breath of life came into the parish.

In 1991 the Holy Trinity Church needed major repairs after 75 years of its existence. At a special meeting, the congregation decided to renovate the church. By 1992 it was completely renovated. Bishop Georgije placed relics of Saint Lazar on the Altar of the renovated church since there were no relics in the Holy Table. The new iconostasis crafted by Momčilo Milošević of Preljina (near Čačak) was installed. The frescoes were painted by Dragan Marunić.

The members of the Church School Congregation generously donated to the construction of Church of Saint Sava at Vračar plateau in Belgrade and collected aid for Serb refugees during the Yugoslav Wars, NATO bombing and its aftermath, the reconstruction period. The Church School Congregation was a great benefactor of the Holy Transfiguration Serbian Orthodox Monastery in Milton. On the recommendation of Bishop Georgije, the Holy Synod awarded the Church School Congregation with the Order of Saint Sava.

In 2012, the 100th anniversary of the founding of this parish, there were two significant events. To celebrate this significant anniversary, there was a celebration of the Divine Liturgy, with a procession around the church. The Divine Liturgy was concelebrated by five priests. In addition, there were special festivities with food and entertainment to mark the occasion which saw people coming from across the country in order to participate in this significant moment for the Serbian Orthodox Eparchy of Canada.

== Gallery ==
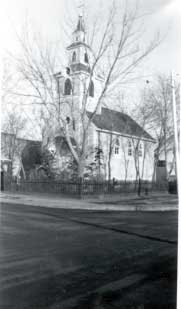
The church pictured in 1954

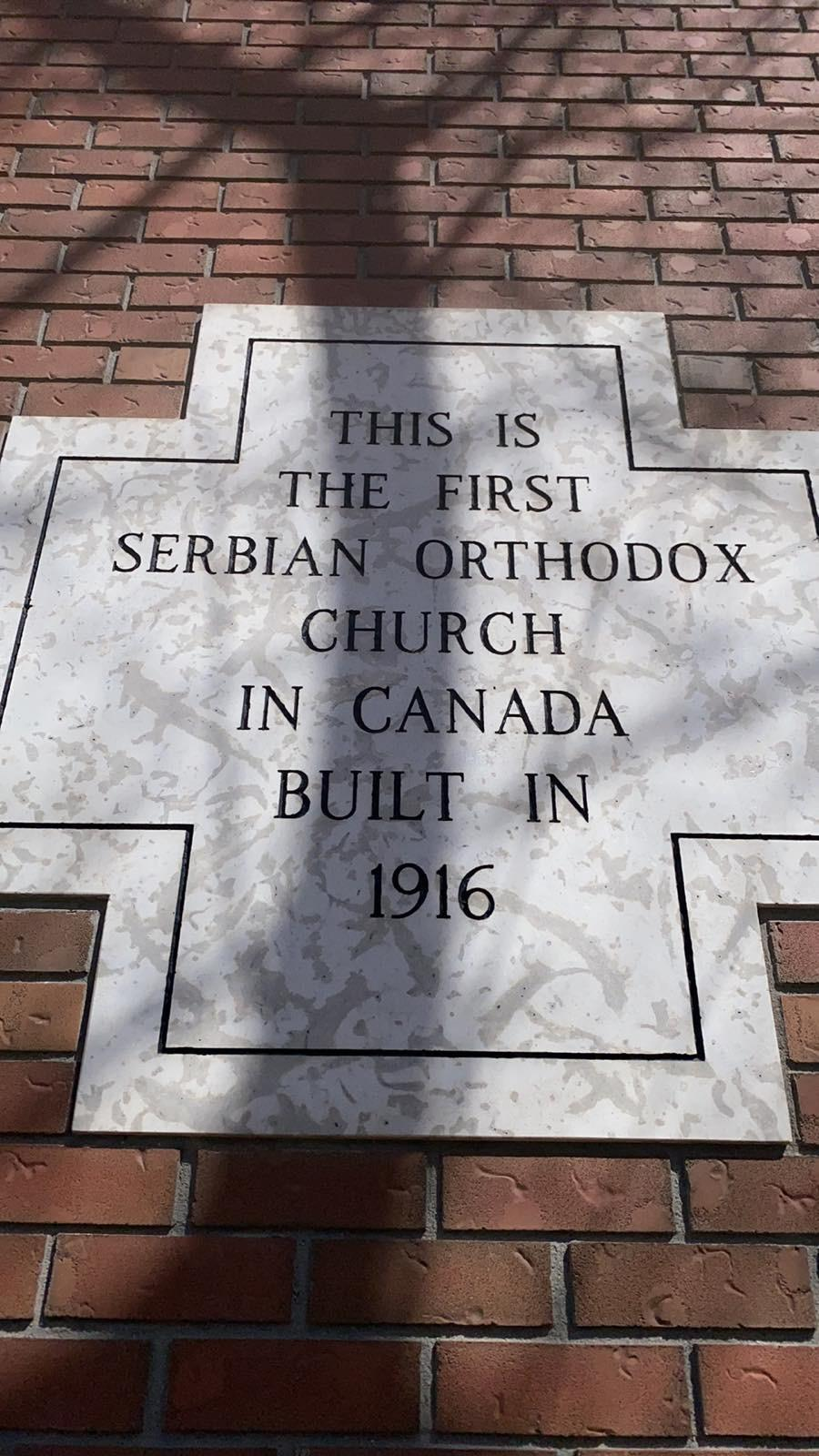
A sign on the exterior of the church

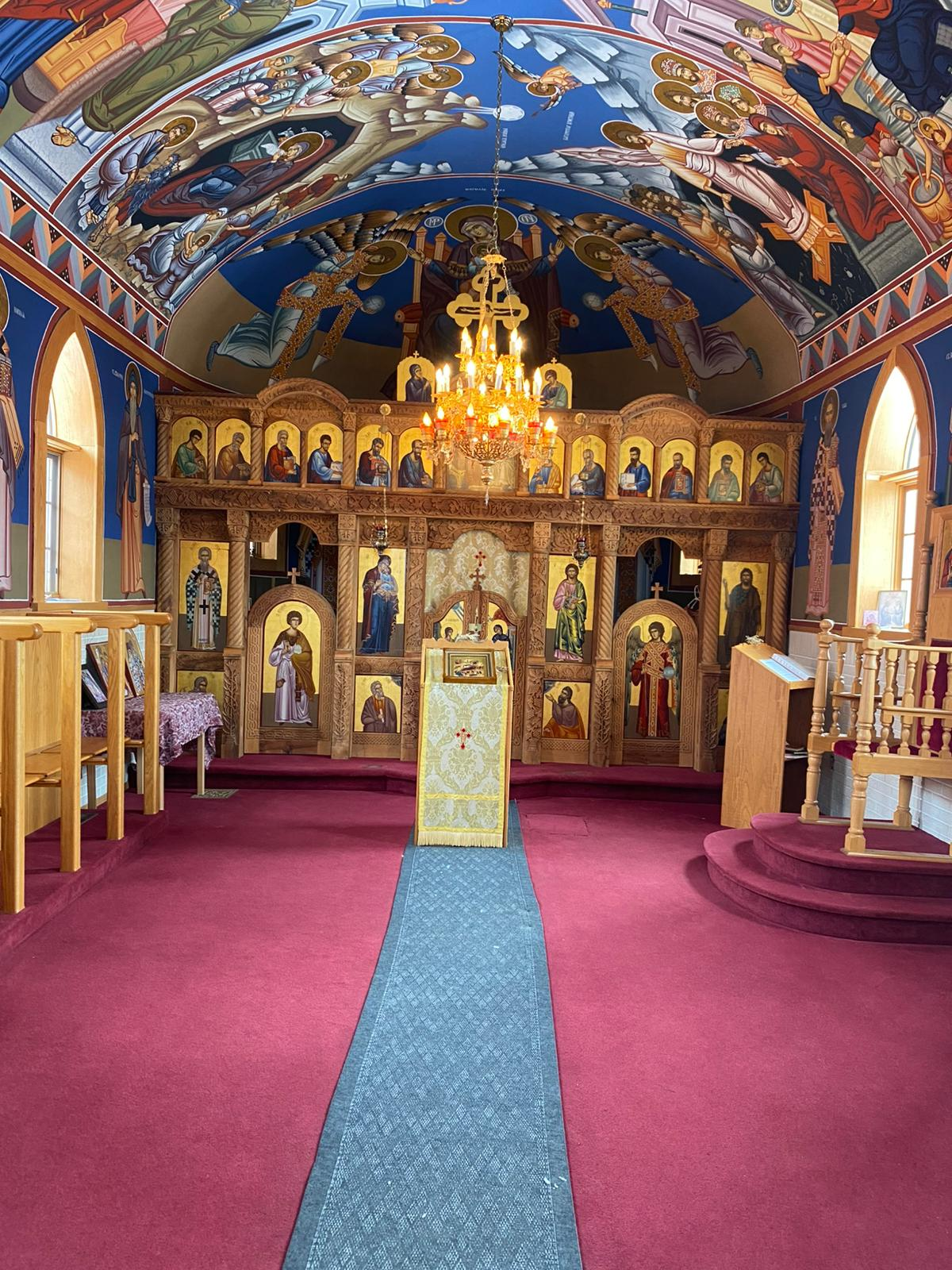
The interior of the church

== See also ==
- Serbian Orthodox Eparchy of Canada
- Serbian Orthodox Church in North and South America
- Serbian Canadians

== Bibliography ==
- Canadian Serbs: A History of Their Social and Cultural Traditions (1956–2002) by Vladimir A. Tomović, 2002, page 115
- War Comes to Regina, For All We Have and Are: Regina and the Experience of the Great War by James M. Pitsula, 2011, pages 21–44 and 178
- Civilian Internment in Canada by John Morchoruk and Rhonda L. Hinther, 2020, page 111
