= Saint Stefan Serbian Orthodox Church (Ottawa) =

Serbian Orthodox church in Ottawa, Canada

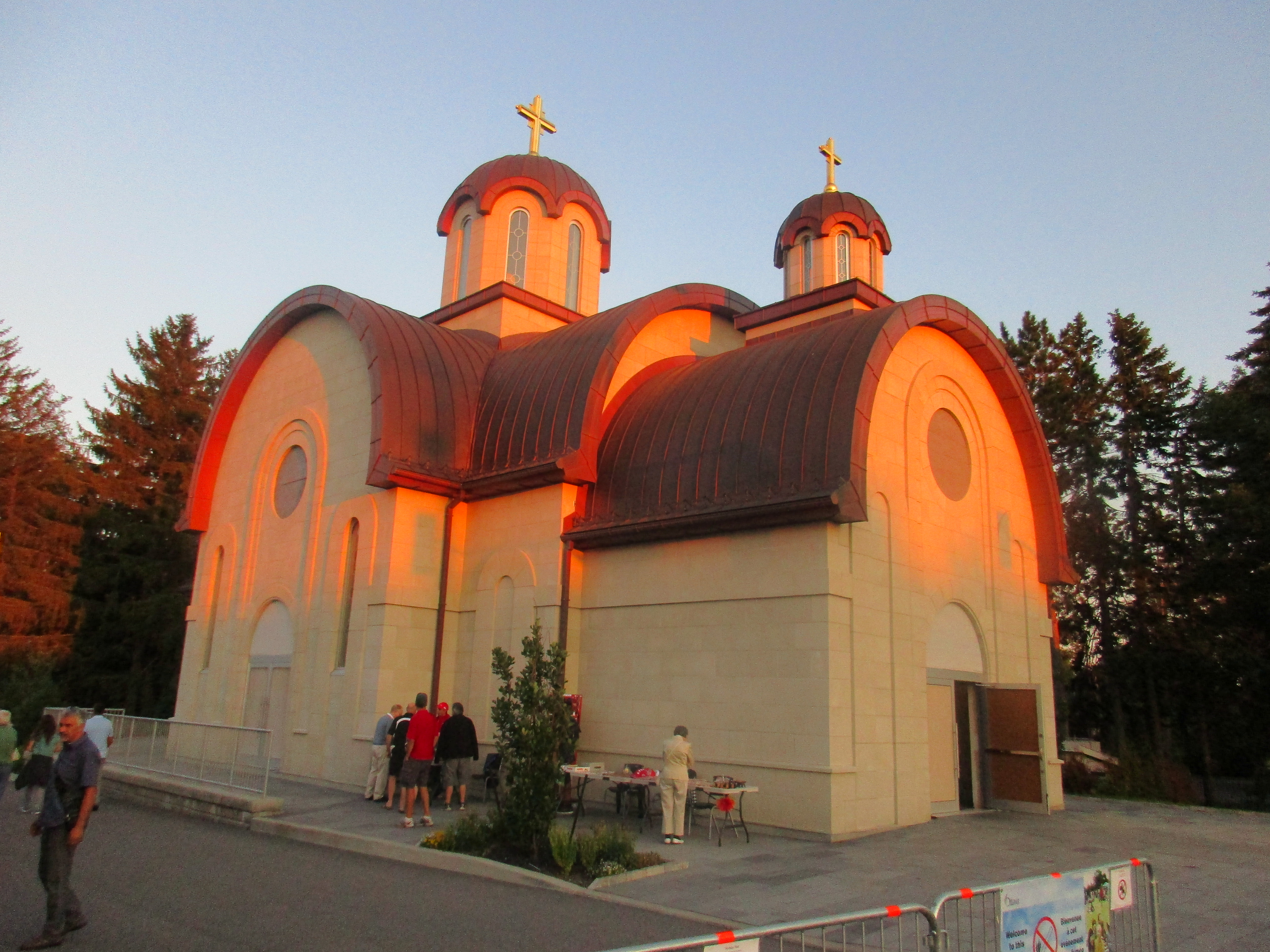
- Saint Stefan Serbian Orthodox Church, pictured in 2016
- Saint Stefan Serbian Orthodox Church
- 45.346484°N 75.700531°W
- Location: 1993 Prince of Wales Drive; Ottawa, Ontario; K2C 3J7
- Denomination: Serbian Orthodox Church
- Website: svetistefan.ca

History
- Founded: June 2014

Architecture
- Architect: Vladimir Popović
- Style: Serbo-Byzantine Revival
- Years built: 2012–2014

Administration
- Diocese: Serbian Orthodox Eparchy of Canada

Clergy
- Priest: Fr. Aleksandar Gujaničić

The Saint Stefan Serbian Orthodox Church (Serbian: Српска православна црква Светог Стефана, romanized: Srpska pravoslavna crkva Svetog Stefana) is an Eastern Orthodox church located in Nepean (Ottawa) Canada. It is under jurisdiction of the Serbian Orthodox Eparchy of Canada of the Serbian Orthodox Church and is home of the Ottawa Serbian Church School Congregation and Community centre.

There are around 2,000 families that nowadays call Saint Stefan Serbian Orthodox Church their spiritual home. Since 2005, the Saint Stefan Serbian Orthodox Church has held an Ottawa Serbian Festival on Canadian Labour Day weekend.

== History ==
The church's founding began with the initiatives of the late Russian interpreter for the Federal government, and activist Nikola Bogdanović, who was elected as President of a new parish in Ottawa. The founders included Vida and Pero Senković (formerly of Montreal), Milan Budimirović, Sava Budimirović, Pera Petrović, Kole Porubić, and Miša Tričković.

On the day of Saint Stefan, 9 January 1976, Bishop Sava (Vuković) initiated the founding of a Church and School Congregation. А Holy Liturgy for the faithful in the area of Ottawa-Gatineau was served and, following the Holy Liturgy, an organizational assembly was held, and a new Church Council was elected with Nikola Bogdanović as president and Dušan Savić, Ranko Ignatović, and Radoš Trišić as members of the board. Bishop Sava, with his official act, approved the Church and School Congregation of Saint Stefan in Ottawa. He appointed Rev. Krsto Rikić of Montreal as administrator.

More than a decade went by until the Church School Congregation, headed by a new board president Savo Budimirović, vice-president Stevan Tomić, treasurer Ana Vandusen, financial secretary Radmila Parojčić, auditors Radoš Trišić, Dane Dozet, and Josef Divić, purchased a house at 361 Dominion Avenue in Ottawa, where the facilities were adapted into a church parish. The chapel was blessed in April 1990 by Bishop Georgije (Đokić), the first bishop of the Serbian Orthodox Eparchy of Canada.

Many roadblocks occurred during 1992 with the city restrictions forcing the chapel at 361 Dominion Avenue to be closed for two years where Serbs could only hold services at All Saints Anglican Church at 347 Richmond Road. In June 1990, Father Vasa Pejović arrived as the priest in Ottawa, and he served in the chapel on Dominion Avenue. In December 1991, Father Milutin Veljko replaced him. Father Milutin left the parish in September 1993, and then the parish was again served by Father Krsto Rikić. Then in 1995 at the time when Protopresbyter Žarko Mirković was assigned in Ottawa the church board members decided to sell the Dominion Avenue property with all its zoning problems and purchase a building at 3662 Albion Road which was converted a year later to a temple and a community centre.

With the Yugoslav Wars and the turmoil that followed, the Serbs of Ottawa and the area increased exponentially and dramatically in numbers from the 1990s and the 2000s. In 2008 the Serbian congregation and community, composed of old settlers and newcomers, began to search for an appropriate location for their future home. They found the land (two adjacent parcels) and built a community centre (2011) and a temple (2013) in the architectural style of the Old Country at 1989 Prince of Wales Drive in Nepean (Ottawa).

The first service was held in the church on June 8, 2014.

== See also ==
- Serbian Orthodox Eparchy of Canada
- Serbian Orthodox Church in North and South America
- Serbian Canadians
