= Saint Petka Serbian Orthodox Church (Lakeshore, Ontario) =

Serbian Orthodox church in Maidstone, Ontario

Coordinates: 42°13′08.0″N 82°49′53.3″W

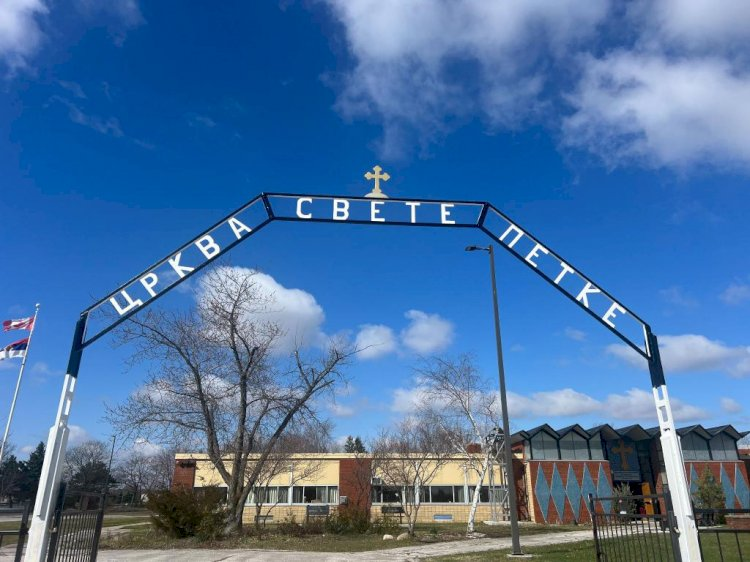
- Saint Petka Serbian Church, pictured in 2024
- Saint Petka Serbian Orthodox Church
- Location: 1501 Lakeshore Road 203; Maidstone, Ontario; N0R 1K0
- Denomination: Serbian Orthodox Church

History
- Founded: February 2014; 12 years ago

Architecture
- Architect: John Peter Thomson
- Architectural type: Postmodern
- Years built: 1962–1964

Administration
- Diocese: Serbian Orthodox Eparchy of Canada

Clergy
- Priest: Fr. Marko Dimić

Saint Petka Serbian Orthodox Church (Serbian: Српска православна црква Свете Петке, romanized: Srpska pravoslavna crkva Svete Petke) is an Eastern Orthodox church located in Lakeshore, Ontario, Canada. It is under jurisdiction of the Serbian Orthodox Eparchy of Canada of the Serbian Orthodox Church.

The church was originally constructed from 1962–64 as the Maidstone Central Public School. The significance and uniqueness of the building is its architectural style of the 1960s when Canada was approaching its centennial year and special attention was given to construction of new schools and other public buildings across the country.

The church is dedicated to Saint Paraskeva of the Balkans, a saint of the Serbian Orthodox Church.

== History ==
=== Maidstone Central Public School ===
In the 1960s prior to the Canadian Centennial some 900 buildings were built with "national unity" in mind. The building is unique for its orientation to landscape, horizontal, clean lines, flat facade, with the main entrance doors surrounded in glass and decorative ceramic tiles. The building was designed and built in Postmodern style by architect John Peter Thomson.

The school was targeted for closure in May 2010.

=== Serbian Orthodox Church ===
The Saint Petka Church and School Congregation was initially founded by Bishop Georgije (Đokić) in February 2014. After operating for 50 years, the Greater Essex County School Board sold the school and 8.21-acre lot to the Serbian Orthodox Eparchy of Canada in April 2014, thanks to more than 300 Serbian donors who attended two on-site fundraising events in March 2014. The school building was then altered inside to serve as a parish home and a community hub to over sixty Serbian families in Tecumseh and Lakeshore, Ontario. With the ascent of Bishop Mitrofan (Kodić), the church gained a new iconostasis in 2019, a new bell tower in 2021 and a new entrance gate in 2024.

Fr. Miroljub Todorović and Fr. Drago Knežević served the parish as temporary priests until 2021, when Metropolitan Mitrofan appointed Fr. Duško Marković as permanent priest. The current priest is Fr. Marko Dimić.

== See also ==
- Serbian Orthodox Eparchy of Canada
- Serbian Orthodox Church in North and South America
- Serbian Canadians
