= Saint Sava Serbian Orthodox Church (Jackson, California) =

Serbian Orthodox church in Jackson, California

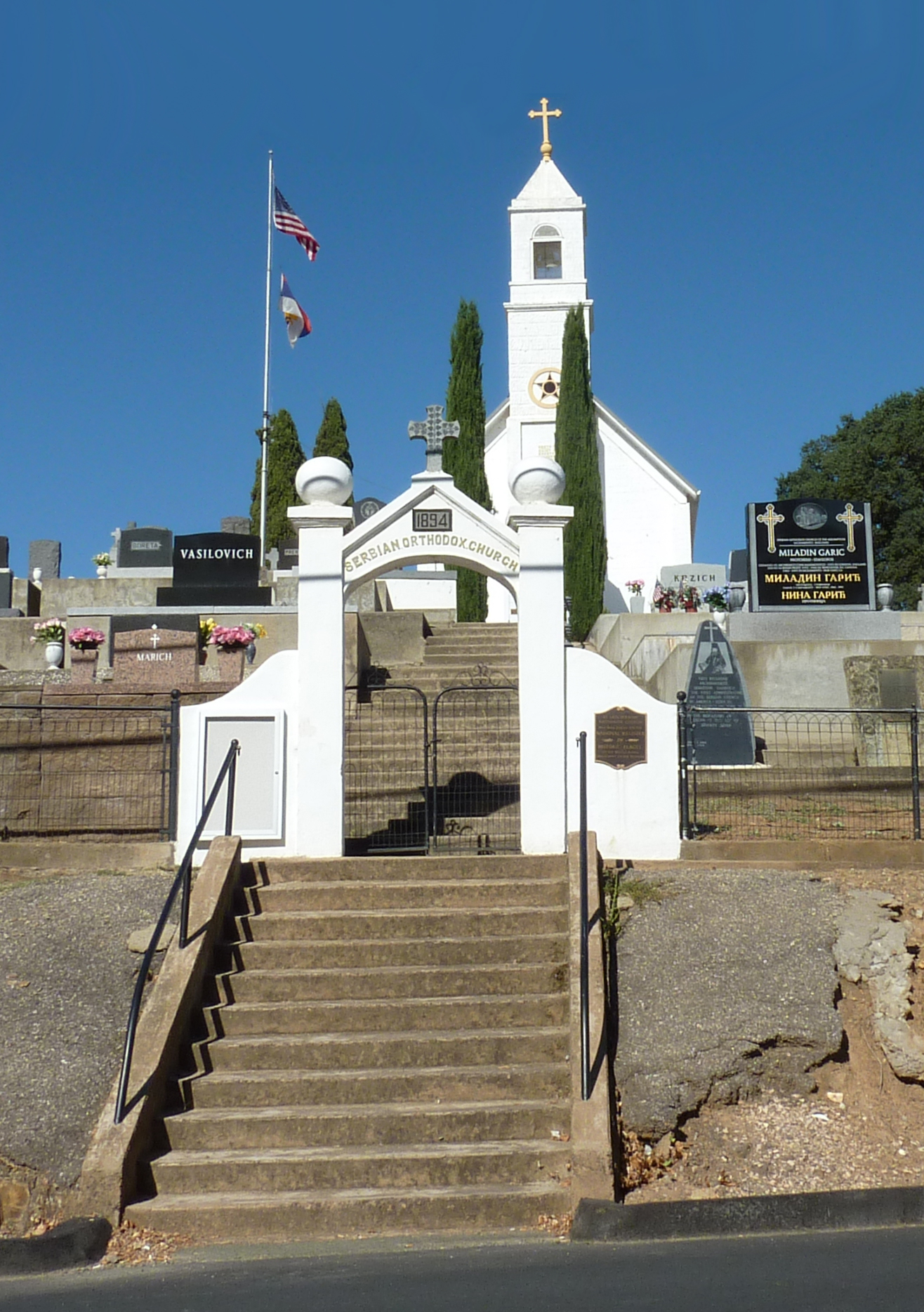
- Saint Sava Serbian Orthodox Church
- Saint Sava Serbian Orthodox Church
- Location: Jackson, California
- Country: United States
- Denomination: Serbian Orthodox Church

History
- Dedication: Saint Sava

Administration
- Diocese: Serbian Orthodox Eparchy of Western America
- Saint Sava Serbian Orthodox Church
- U.S. National Register of Historic Places
- Location within California Location within the United States
- Location: 724 N. Main, Jackson, California
- Coordinates: 38°21′21″N 120°46′31″W
- Area: 1.2 acres (0.49 ha)
- Built: 1894
- Architect: Thompson, Mr.
- NRHP reference No.: 86000385
- Added to NRHP: March 6, 1986

The Saint Sava Serbian Orthodox Church (Serbian: Српска православна црква Светог Саве, romanized: Srpska pravoslavna crkva Svetog Save) is an Eastern Orthodox church located in Jackson, California. It is under jurisdiction of the Serbian Orthodox Eparchy of Canada of the Serbian Orthodox Church and is dedicated to Saint Sava, the first Archbishop of the Serbian Orthodox Church.

Built in 1894, the church was the first Serbian Orthodox church in America. Amador County had a large Serbian American population in the late 1800s due to the California Gold Rush, and the county's Serbs established the St. Sava Church Organization of Amador County in 1886–87; the organization was responsible for purchasing land for and building the church, and the effort was led by Sevastijan Dabović. The church's original design had an Eastern Orthodox influence, complete with an onion dome; while the dome was later replaced by a bell tower, the church's stained glass windows and use of icons still give it a distinctive Eastern Orthodox Christian character. The church has been used for Serbian American religious and social activities since its opening and is now part of the Serbian Orthodox Eparchy of Western America.

Next to the church is the Saint Sava Cemetery, where early California Gold Rush prospectors and parishioners and their descendants are buried.

In 1922, there was a mining disaster that impacted the town as a whole, but especially the Italian and Serbian communities in Jackson. There is a monument to eleven Argonaut Miners buried at Saint Sava's. The mass burial was held on September 22, 1922, for 47 migrant miners, among them 17 were from Italy, eleven were from Serbian native lands in the Balkans, and the others were from other European countries, namely Spain, Sardinia, Austria, Germany, Portugal, Sweden and Switzerland. Two decades later, another disaster occurred in Montana at the Smith Mine where 74 miners perished, among them several Serbs.

The church was added to the National Register of Historic Places on March 6, 1986.

== See also ==
- Serbian Orthodox Eparchy of Western America
- Serbian Orthodox Church in North and South America
- Serbian Americans

== Sources ==
- Vuković, Sava (1998). History of the Serbian Orthodox Church in America and Canada 1891–1941. Kragujevac: Kalenić.
