= Saint Nicholas Serbian Orthodox Cathedral (Hamilton, Ontario) =

Serbian Orthodox cathedral in Hamilton, Ontario

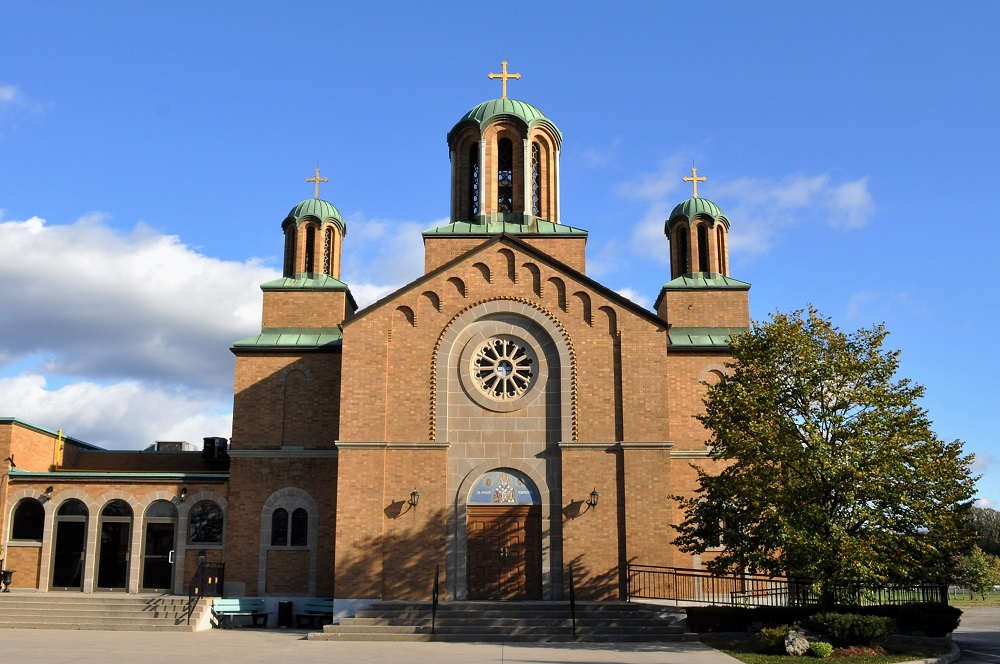
- Saint Nicholas Serbian Orthodox Cathedral, pictured in 2016
- Saint Nicholas Serbian Orthodox Cathedral
- 43.2239°N 79.7756°W
- Location: 149 Nash Road South; Hamilton, Ontario; L8K 4J9
- Denomination: Serbian Orthodox Church
- Website: snsn.ca

History
- Consecrated: June 20, 1965

Architecture
- Years built: 1964–1965
- Groundbreaking: October 5, 1964

Administration
- Diocese: Serbian Orthodox Eparchy of Canada

Clergy
- Priest(s): V. Rev. Dragomir Ninković; Rev. Đuro Samac

The Saint Nicholas Serbian Orthodox Cathedral (Serbian: Саборна црква Светог Оца Николаја, romanized: Saborna crkva Svetog Oca Nikolaja) is an Eastern Orthodox cathedral located in Hamilton, Ontario, Canada. It is under jurisdiction of the Serbian Orthodox Eparchy of Canada of the Serbian Orthodox Church and serves as its cathedral church.

== History ==
In 1913, the first church-school municipality in Eastern Canada dedicated to Saint Nicholas was created on land on the corner of Beach Road and Northcote Avenue in Hamilton, and a small church was built.

The descendants of the first settlers, and other Serbs who settled in Hamilton, decided in December 1963 to build a new temple dedicated to Saint Nicholas, and that the church-school municipality was to be in full canonical and administrative unity with the Serbian Patriarchate, under whose jurisdiction it is. In June 1964, the land was consecrated. The digging of the foundation began on October 5, 1964; the church was consecrated on June 20, 1965, and then the parish house was built.

The first Canadian bishop Georgije was enthroned in this temple on the day of the Intercession of the Blessed Virgin Mary on October 14, 1984.

== See also ==
- Serbian Orthodox Eparchy of Canada
- Serbian Canadians
