= Crnjelovo Gornje =

Crnjelovo Gornje Црњелово Горње (Serbian)
- Village (Selo)
- Location within Bosnia and Herzegovina
- Coordinates: 44°50′19.66″N 19°5′22.14″E
- Country: Bosnia and Herzegovina
- Entity: Republika Srpska
- City: Bijeljina

Population (2013)
  - Total: 1,406
- Time zone: UTC+1 (CET)
  - Summer (DST): UTC+2 (CEST)
- Postal code: 76300

Crnjelovo Gornje (Serbian Cyrillic: Црњелово Горње) is a small village in Bosnia and Herzegovina, located north of the city of Bijeljina in the entity of Republika Srpska.

== Notable residents ==
- Georgije Đokić
