= Holy Transfiguration Serbian Orthodox Monastery (Milton, Ontario) =

Serbian Orthodox monastery in Milton, Canada

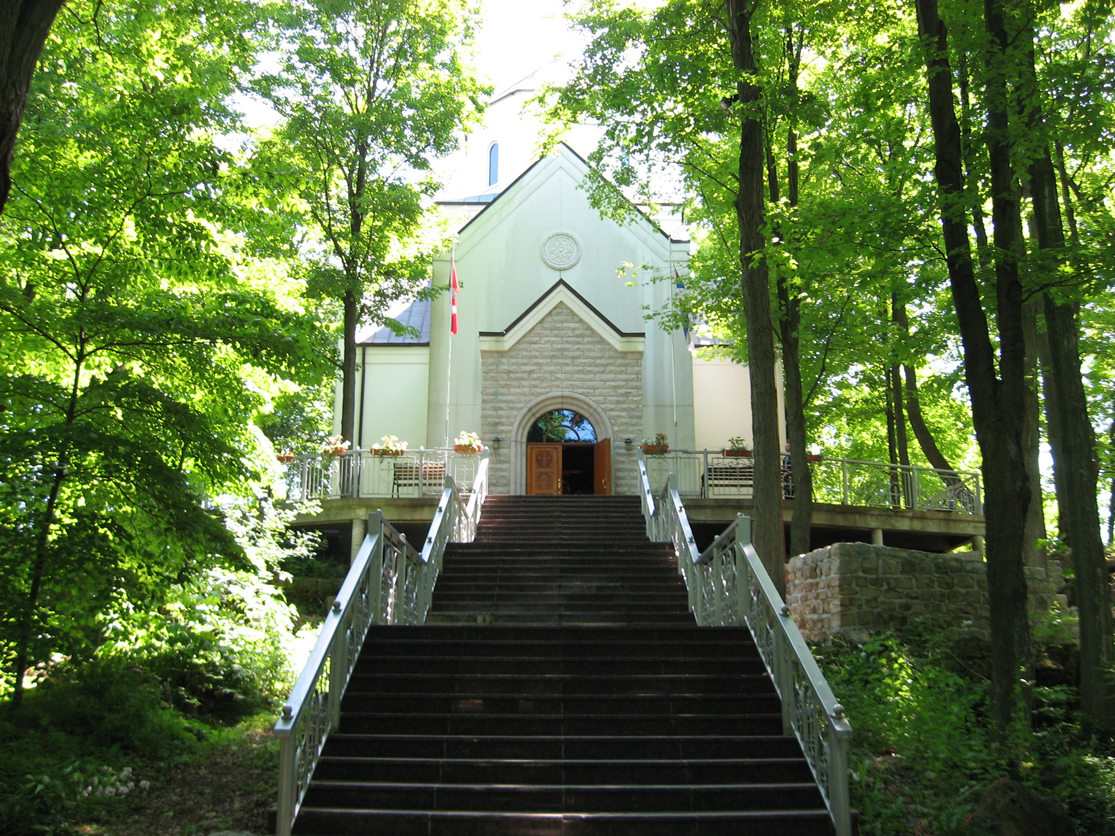
- Holy Transfiguration Serbian Orthodox Monastery, pictured in 2007
- Holy Transfiguration Serbian Orthodox Monastery
- Location: 7470 McNiven Road, RR#3, Campbellville, Milton, Ontario L0P 1B0
- Denomination: Serbian Orthodox Church
- Website: istocnik.ca/en/monastery

History
- Founder: Georgije (Đokić)
- Dedication: Transfiguration of Jesus
- Consecrated: June 12, 1994; 32 years ago

Architecture
- Architect: Marija Jovin
- Style: Serbo-Byzantine Revival

Administration
- Diocese: Serbian Orthodox Eparchy of Canada

The Holy Transfiguration Serbian Orthodox Monastery (Serbian: Манастир Светог Преображења Господњег, romanized: Manastir Svetog Preobraženja Gospodnjeg) is an Eastern Orthodox Christian monastery located in Campbellville, Milton, Ontario, at Niagara Escarpment, UNESCO World Biosphere Reserve. It is under jurisdiction of the Serbian Orthodox Eparchy of Canada of the Serbian Orthodox Church and serves as its headquarters. It is the first and only Serbian Orthodox monastery in Canada.

Next to the monastery church, there is also the first Serbian cemetery in Canada, a bishop's palace, a library, a children's playground, as well as a picnic area with a summer pavilion, kitchens, a fishing pond, and sports fields for soccer, volleyball, and basketball.

== History ==
The aspiration of the Serbian community in Canada to build their own monastery was expressed in the hopes of Bishop Nikolaj Velimirović. The realization of these aspirations began with the formation of an independent diocese and the arrival of the Bishop of Canada Georgije Đokić at the head of the diocese. The land of about twenty hectares on which the Holy Transfiguration Monastery was later built was found and purchased in early 1988. The consecration of the land was performed in 1988. Marija Jovin, an architect from Serbia, was commissioned to prepare, on instructions of Bishop Georgije, the monastery plans. In addition to the aforementioned Marija Jovin, architect Richard Reichard of the Snider Reichard March Architects firm also helped considerably in the building of the monastery church. The main designer of the monastery was engineer Branko Dželetović, while construction was also carried out by master builder Ranko Vukosavljević. The model of the monastery, built by the brother of the Kaona Monastery and the then-secretary of the Diocese of Canada Milutin Knežević, was exhibited and presented for the first time in 1989.

The foundation stone of the future monastery was consecrated by the Serbian Patriarch Pavle in 1992. The concelebrants were Metropolitan of Montenegro and the Littoral Amfilohije (Radović), Metropolitan of Midwestern America Christopher (Kovacevich), Metropolitan of New Gračanica Irinej (Kovačević), Bishop of Žiča Stefan (Boca), Bishop of Niš Irinej (Gavrilović), Bishop of Canada Georgije (Đokić), and Bishop of Eastern America Mitrofan (Kodić). On the diocesan estate in Milton, Patriarch Pavle signed a charter that was later incorporated into the foundations of the monastery church.

The foundation of the monastery church was blessed on May 2, 1993. At the Monastery Council held from 7-8 August 1993, Bishop of Dalmatia Longin Krčo, with the concelebration of Bishop of Canada Georgije (Đokić), consecrated the Saint Sava Cross, which was gilded and erected on the monastery's dome on 25 August 1993.

Patriarch Pavle also consecrated the monastery church on the day of its completion in 1994. The concelebrants were Metropolitan of Midwestern America Christopher Kovacevich, Bishop of Niš Irinej Gavrilović, Bishop of Slavonia Lukijan Pantelić, Bishop of Canada Georgije Đokić, Bishop of Gornji Karlovac Nikanor Bogunović, Bishop of Eastern America Mitrofan Kodić, Bishop of Britain and Scandinavia Dositej Motika, and Bishop of Mileševa Vasilije Veinović. About twenty thousand people attended, and among the numerous guests from Sweden, Australia, England, and other countries was Prince Tomislav of Yugoslavia. The iconostasis was made by the woodcarver Momčilo Milošević. The fresco painting of the church began after its construction and took place in several phases with work being completed in 2002. The iconography and frescoes were the work of Dragomir "Dragan" Marunić and his assistants – deacon Nikola Lubardić and Dragan Stanković.

The monastery endowment funders are Olga Aćimov, Gojko and Evgenija Kuzmanović, the Holy Trinity Church and School Congregation in Regina, Ilija Rakanović, and Dragomir Karić while major benefactors are Nedeljko and Nada Vujić, Milena Protić, Radoš Marić, and the diocesan Circle of Serbian Sisters.

== Gallery ==
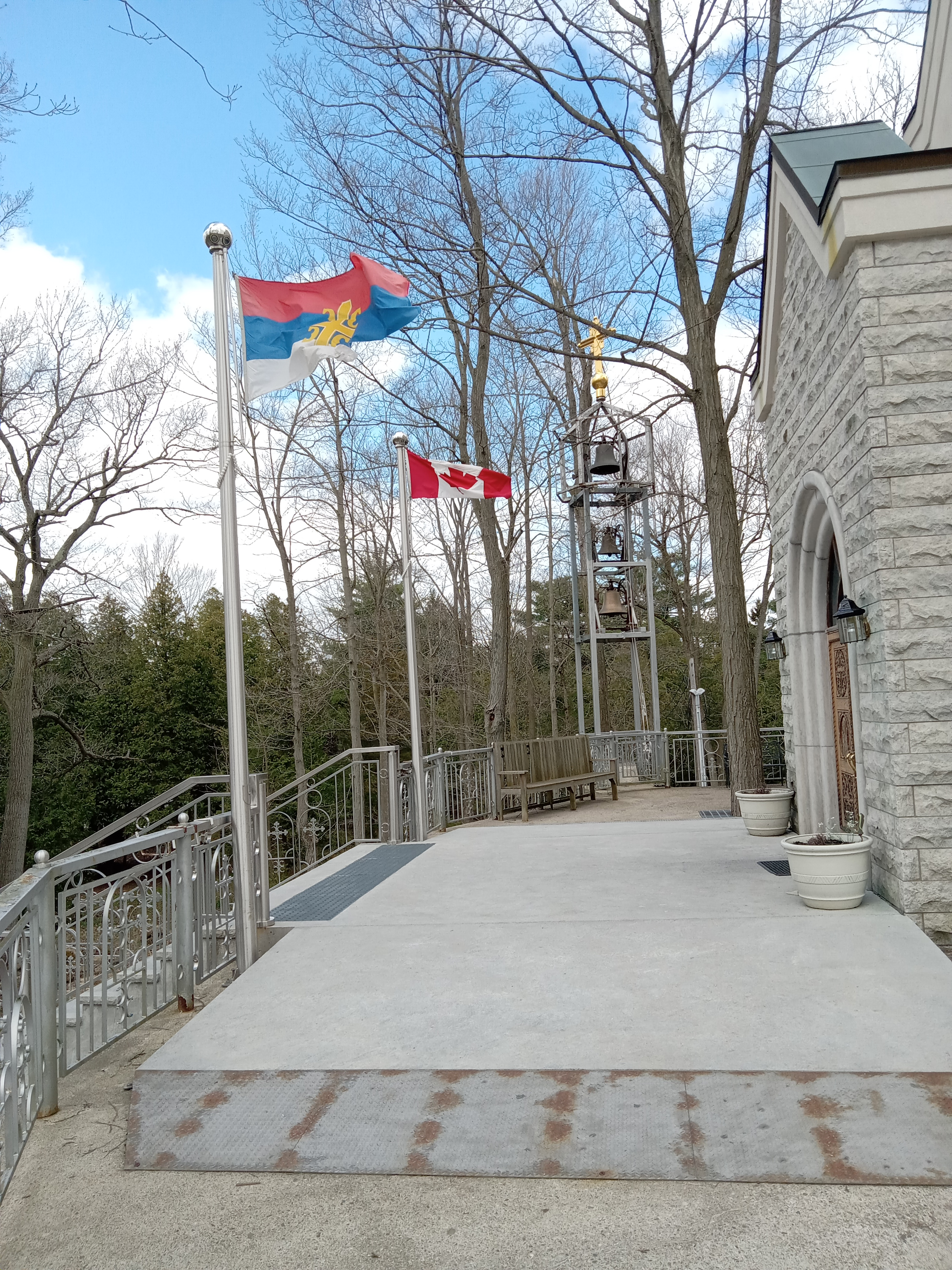
Flags of Serbian Orthodox Church and Canada at the entrance of the monastery church

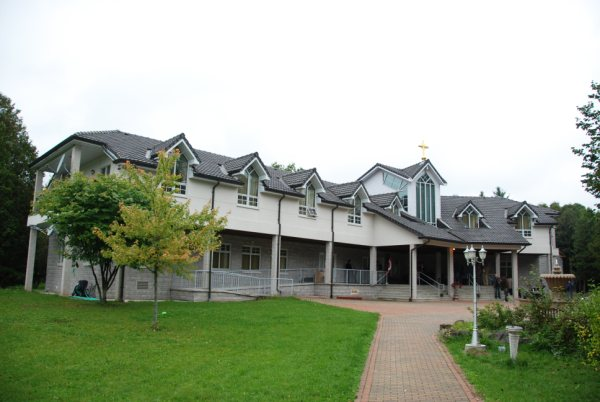
The episcopal residence

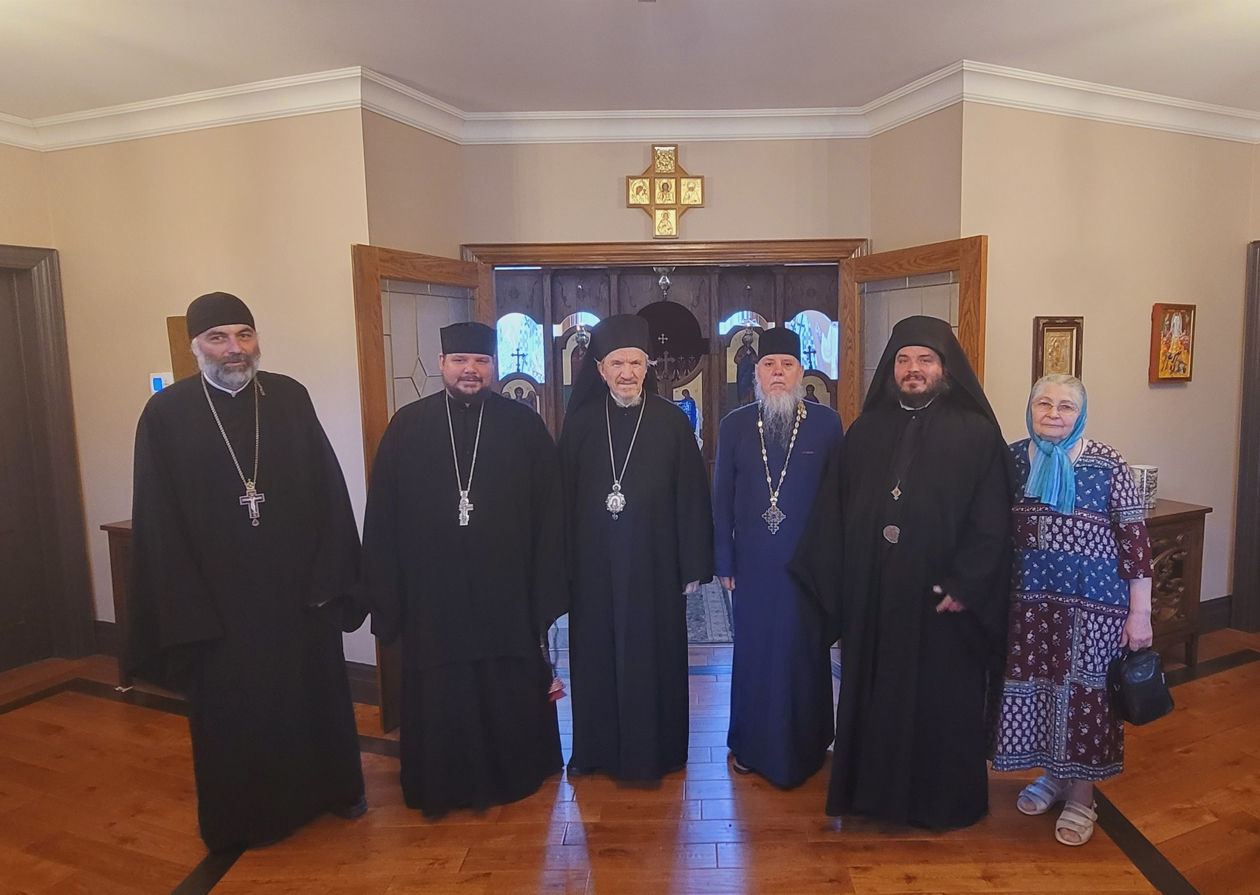
Bishop Mitrofan with members of the GOC and ROC in front of the chapel in the episcopal residence

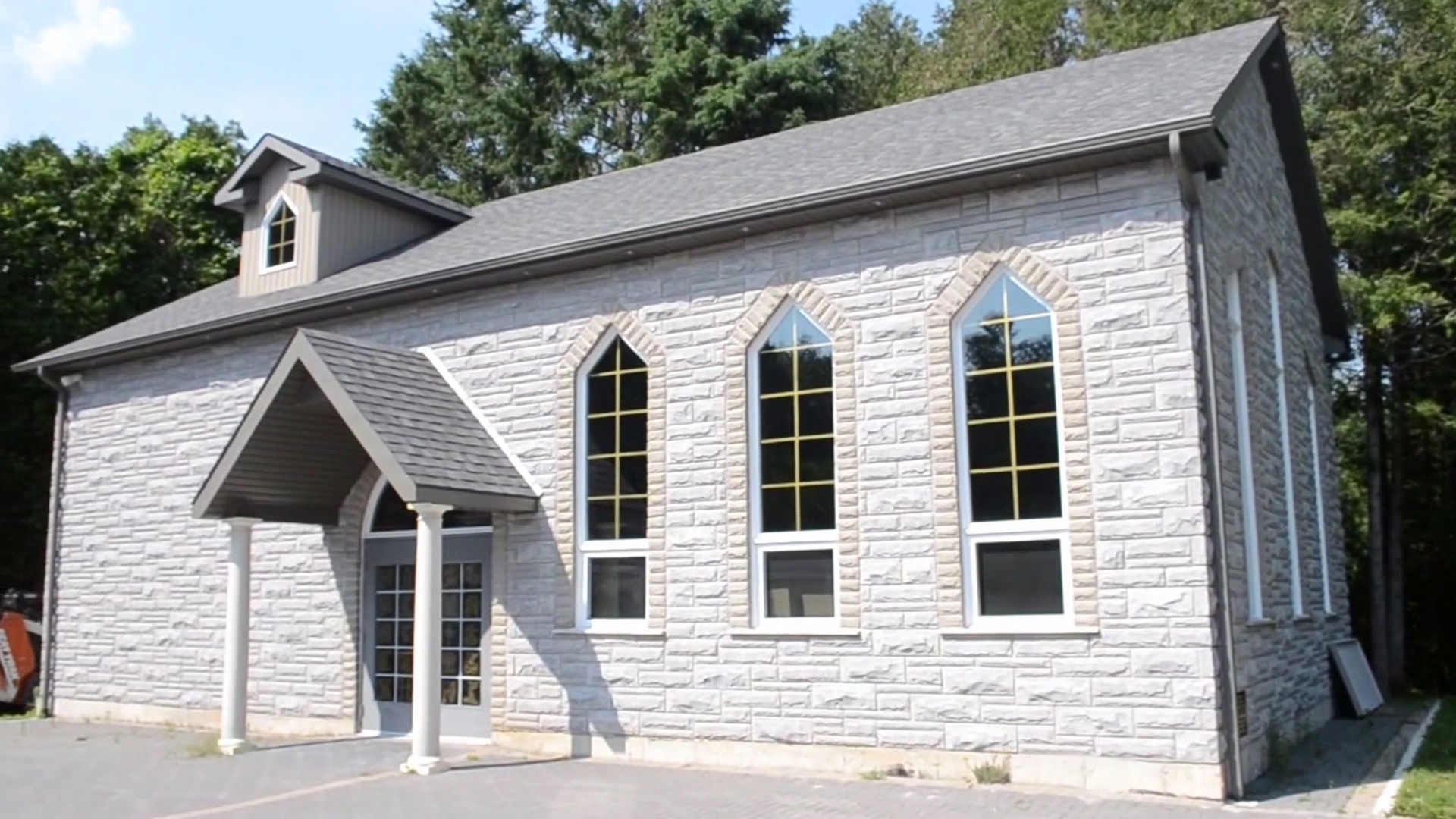
The diocesan library, archive and museum

== See also ==
- Serbian Orthodox Church in North and South America
- List of Serbian Orthodox monasteries
- Serbian Canadians
