= Holy Trinity Serbian Orthodox Church (Montreal) =

Serbian Orthodox church in Montreal, Quebec

Coordinates: 45°28′58″N 73°35′46″W

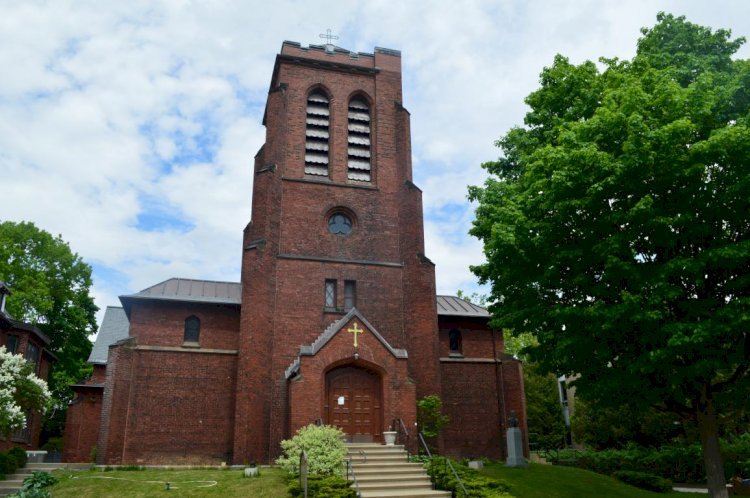
- Holy Trinity Serbian Orthodox Church, pictured in 2024
- Holy Trinity Serbian Orthodox Church
- Location: 349 Avenue Melville, Westmount, Montreal, Quebec; QC H3Z 2J8
- Denomination: Serbian Orthodox Church
- Website: www.svetatrojica.ca

History
- Consecrated: October 31, 1976

Architecture
- Architectural type: Romanesque Revival

Administration
- Diocese: Serbian Orthodox Eparchy of Canada

Clergy
- Priest: Fr. Vladimir Vranić

The Holy Trinity Serbian Orthodox Church (Serbian: Српска православна црква Свеta Тројицa, romanized: Srpska pravoslavna crkva Sveta Trojica) is an Eastern Orthodox church located in Westmount, a suburb of Montreal, Quebec. It is under jurisdiction of the Serbian Orthodox Eparchy of Canada of the Serbian Orthodox Church.

== History ==
Ethnic Serb immigrants arrived in Montreal in the early 20th century. On 23 February 1954, Bishop Dionisije (Milivojević) appointed hieromonk Justinian (Ilkić) to the Serbian community of Montreal as their parish priest, the same year he arrived in Canada. Justinian Ilkić was a seminary graduate and former monk of the Monastery of Visoki Dečani in the Serbian province of Kosovo whose abbot was Dionisije himself before he became Bishop (1939) and took over the American-Canadian Diocese in 1940. Father Justinian gathered all Montreal Serbs and formed a Church-School Congregation on 6 February 1954.

With the arrival of V. Rev. Dimitrije Najdanović from Derby, England, to Montreal in 1960, things began to progress more. A year later, the Serbian community of Montreal had a church, a community centre and a priest residence all under the same roof on De Bullion Street. The commissions for the iconostasis were given to a master woodcarver Vladimir Barac and the icon painting to internationally renowned, Kraljevo-born artist José Majzner, then residing in Montreal. The consecration date was set for 12 June 1963 but it was postponed on several occasions. Soon the numerous complaints that were filed with the Patriarch of the Serbian Orthodox Church German against Dionisije during the years before 1963, came to roost and Dionisije was called into question as to his suitability to serve as a Bishop and his administration of the Diocese. This action of the Serbian Orthodox Church prompted Dionisije to sever all ties with the Church and begin a series of lawsuits that were only settled after his death.

By avoiding the schism and costly legal battles in the 1960s, the members of the new Montreal Church Council and Dr. Dragutin "Drago" Papić, a renowned Montreal surgeon, as president of the construction committee, were able to raise sufficient funds from the Serbian parishioners to purchase outright a former Presbyterian Church in 1976 along with an adjacent rectory in an established and prestigious Montreal enclave of Westmount. This was thanks to the doctor's wife Jelena Papić, Ph.D., who first learned that the church was being sold and negotiated a fair price for its purchase.

In October 2024, the Patriarch of the Serbian Orthodox Church Porfirije visited Canada to commemorate the 70th Anniversary of its existence as a Montreal parish and community.

== Architecture ==
Originally completed in 1900 as the Melville Presbyterian to the architectural design of Edward Maxwell, the church came with a stately manse next door. Consecration of the new Holy Trinity church was held on The Holy Apostle and Evangelist Luke, 31 October 1976, officiated by Bishop Sava (Vukovich) of the Serbian Orthodox Eparchy of Eastern America in the year of the Summer Olympic Games in Montreal. Ten years later, the church council launched a building fund for the repairs and reconstruction of the Serbian Community Centre.

== See also ==
- Serbian Orthodox Eparchy of Canada
- Serbian Orthodox Church in North and South America
- Serbian Canadians
