= Serbian Orthodox Church in North and South America =

The Serbian Orthodox Church in North and South America encompasses five dioceses (eparchies) with almost 220 churches, chapels, monasteries and sketes in the United States, Canada, and Latin America.

== History ==
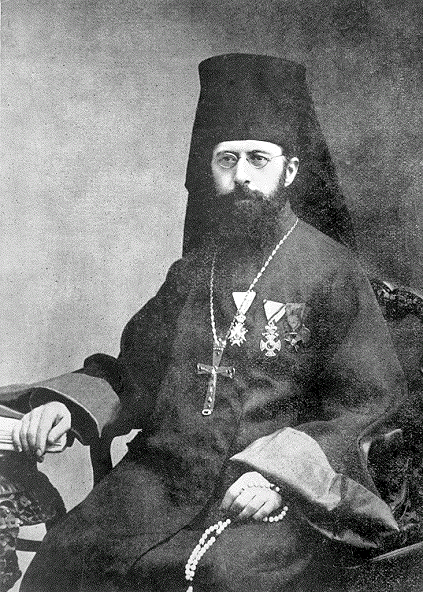
Serbian Orthodox priest Sevastijan Dabović (1863-1940), born in San Francisco

The arrival of the first Serbian Orthodox Christian emigrants to the Americas began in the first half of the 19th century. The first secretary of the California Land Commission was George Fisher (Đorđe Šagić) who came to America in 1825 and is remembered as an eminent American pioneer.

When Serbs came to Amador and Calaveras counties in the late 19th century, many of the mining companies in those counties were Slavonian-owned or managed. They also came to the United States of America via Mexico, then under the rule of an Austrian Archduke Maximillian.

By the end of the century, more Serb immigrants continued to come from Austria-Hungary, from the Kingdom of Serbia, Principality of Montenegro and from the Ottoman Empire since not all Serb territories were liberated at the time. Emigration was mainly directed to the United States and Canada where industries thrived. Among emigrants, there were several Serbian Orthodox priests, and by the end of the 19th-century first parish communities were established and churches built. The city of Douglas in Alaska was a very rich mining town at the turn of the century. During this time, large groups of Serbs from Montenegro came to Douglas to work in the gold mines of the Treadwell Company. Among these Serb pioneers arose the traditional desire to establish their own church as well as their own print shop. An article told of the first Serbian pioneers in Alaska and their fraternal efforts to build a church for themselves and for the generations of Serbs in Alaska. These documents were signed by 286 members of the Saint Sava Church, eight members of the church board and three priests, headed by Archimandrite Sebastian Dabovich in Douglas, Alaska.

After the gold rush days, many of these pioneers moved to the big cities where they formed social groups. One of the first societies they organized with other Slavonians was the Slavonian Illyrian Benevolent Society of San Francisco in 1857. A branch of this society, one of many branches in California, was established in Sutter Creek, California in 1872. The Sutter Creek branch erected a lodge building on the society's property in 1874. This was the earliest recorded Slavonian social hall built in western America. Others followed suit: Amador County Serbs organized the "St. Sava Church Organization" of Amador County in 1886. These early societies provided many services to their members and the community. They tended the ill: gave help to the aged; and provided burial services for the deceased. They organized annual celebrations of Saint Sava's Day (Savindan), the patron saint of the Serb people, and Vidovdan commemorating the Battle of Kosovo in 1389. They met to listen to famous guslars, to sing their cherished songs, and to dance the kolo. The members of the "Saint Sava Church Organization" of Amador County played a major role in the building of Saint Sava Church in Jackson, California.

Therefore, the San Francisco Bay Area can be rightly considered one of the first centers of Orthodox Christianity in the United States, as Serbs played a major role in its early development by forming the "Russian, Greek, Serbian Organization of San Francisco" in 1864. Most of the early members of this organization were Serbs. There are documents showing that there were attempts to enlist a Serbian Orthodox priest from Kotor to serve a community as early as the 1870s. Of these early Orthodox priests in America, we know very little about them because of the scarcity of sources on their missions. Somehow more is known of the activities of American-born Father Sebastian Dabovich and the Archimandrite Firmilijan, who came from Serbia to serve the Serbs in Chicago in 1892.

In 1893-1894, Saint Sava Church was built in Jackson, California, thanks to the efforts of priest Sebastian Dabovich, who was the first Eastern Orthodox priest born in the United States. Since there was no Serbian eparchy in the United States, parishes that were formed during that period were temporarily placed under the jurisdiction of the Russian Orthodox Diocese in North America.

In the eave of the World War I, first steps were made towards the creation of a particular Serbian Orthodox Eparchy in the United States, under the ecclesiastical jurisdiction of the Serbian Orthodox Church. It was officially established as the Serbian Orthodox Eparchy of America and Canada, in 1921, by the Holy Synod of the Serbian Orthodox Church. In 1923, the administration of the Diocese was entrusted to archimandrite Mardarije Uskoković, who was elected and consecrated as Serbian Orthodox bishop of America and Canada in 1926. After his death in 1935, the diocese was administered until the election of a new bishop Dionisije Milivojević in 1939 who arrived in the United States in 1940 to assume the position.

By the middle of the 20th century, the network of Serbian Orthodox communities in the United States and Canada was much expanded due to constant immigration, and soon after the World War II, it was proposed on several occasions to reorganize the vast continental diocese by division into two or three regional dioceses. Those proposals were opposed by Bishop Dionisije who favored centralized administration. Gradually, various administrative problems escalated and by 1963 final decisions were made by the central authorities of the Serbian Orthodox Church to reorganize and divide the diocese into three regional eparchies. In 1963, the Serbian Orthodox Church in North America was organized into: Serbian Orthodox Eparchy of Eastern America and Canada, Serbian Orthodox Eparchy of Midwestern America, and Serbian Orthodox Eparchy of Western America.

In 1983, a fourth eparchy was created specifically for Canadian churches: the Serbian Orthodox Eparchy of Canada.

The reorganization was strongly opposed by bishop Dionisije, who was supported by several fractions of Serbian political emigration in the United States. The conflict resulted in schism since Dionisije refused to recognize decisions of the Holy Synod of the Serbian Orthodox Church. Thus, two parallel ecclesiastical structures were created, the official "patriarchal" branch organized into three eparchies, and an alternative "free" branch headed by Dionisije, who was officially deposed.

== Dioceses ==
Dioceses of the Serbian Orthodox Church in North America

=== United States ===
As of 2020, there were 121 parishes with 59,876 adherents, of which only 8,431 regularly attended in the United States.

- Serbian Orthodox Eparchy of Eastern America - Bishop Irinej Dobrijević
- Serbian Orthodox Eparchy of New Gračanica and Midwestern America - Bishop Longin Krčo
- Serbian Orthodox Eparchy of Western America - Bishop Maksim Vasiljević

=== Canada ===
- Serbian Orthodox Eparchy of Canada - Bishop Mitrofan Kodić

=== Latin America ===
- Serbian Orthodox Eparchy of Buenos Aires, South America, and Central America - Bishop Kirilo Bojović

== Notable churches ==
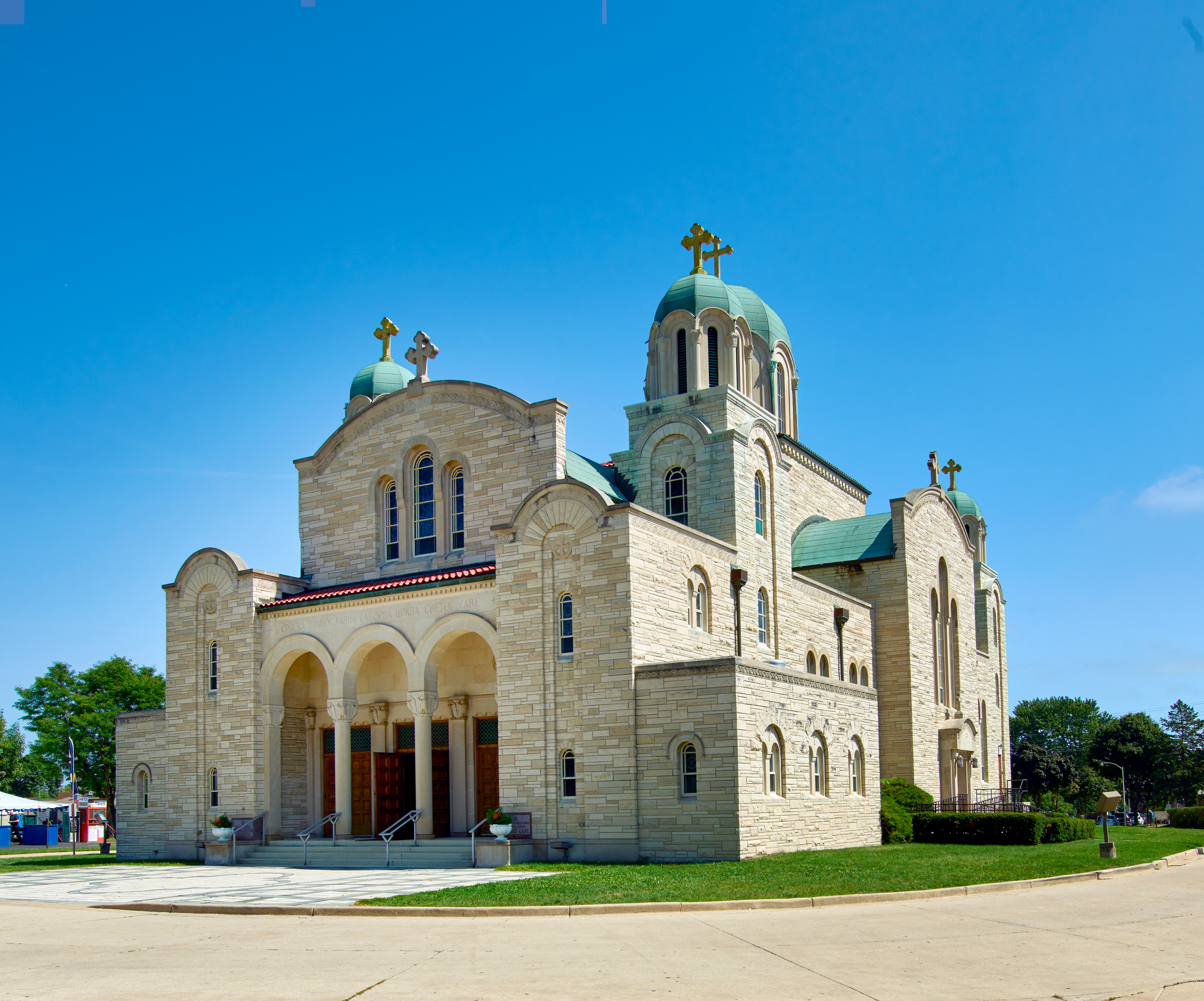
Saint Sava Church, Milwaukee

=== United States ===
- Saint Sava Serbian Orthodox Church (New York City)
- Saint Sava Serbian Orthodox Church (Milwaukee)
- Saint Sava Serbian Orthodox Church (Jackson, California)
- Saint Sava Serbian Orthodox Church (Merrillville, Indiana)
- Saints Constantine and Helen Serbian Orthodox Church (Galveston, Texas)

=== Canada ===
- Saint Sava Serbian Orthodox Church (Toronto)
- Saint Sava Serbian Orthodox Church (Winnipeg)
- Saint Stefan Serbian Orthodox Church (Ottawa)
- Holy Trinity Serbian Orthodox Church (Montreal)
- Holy Trinity Serbian Orthodox Church (Regina)
- All Serbian Saints Serbian Orthodox Church (Mississauga)
- Saint Arsenije Sremac Serbian Orthodox Church (Whitby, Ontario)
- Saint Petka Serbian Orthodox Church (Lakeshore, Ontario)

== Notable monasteries ==
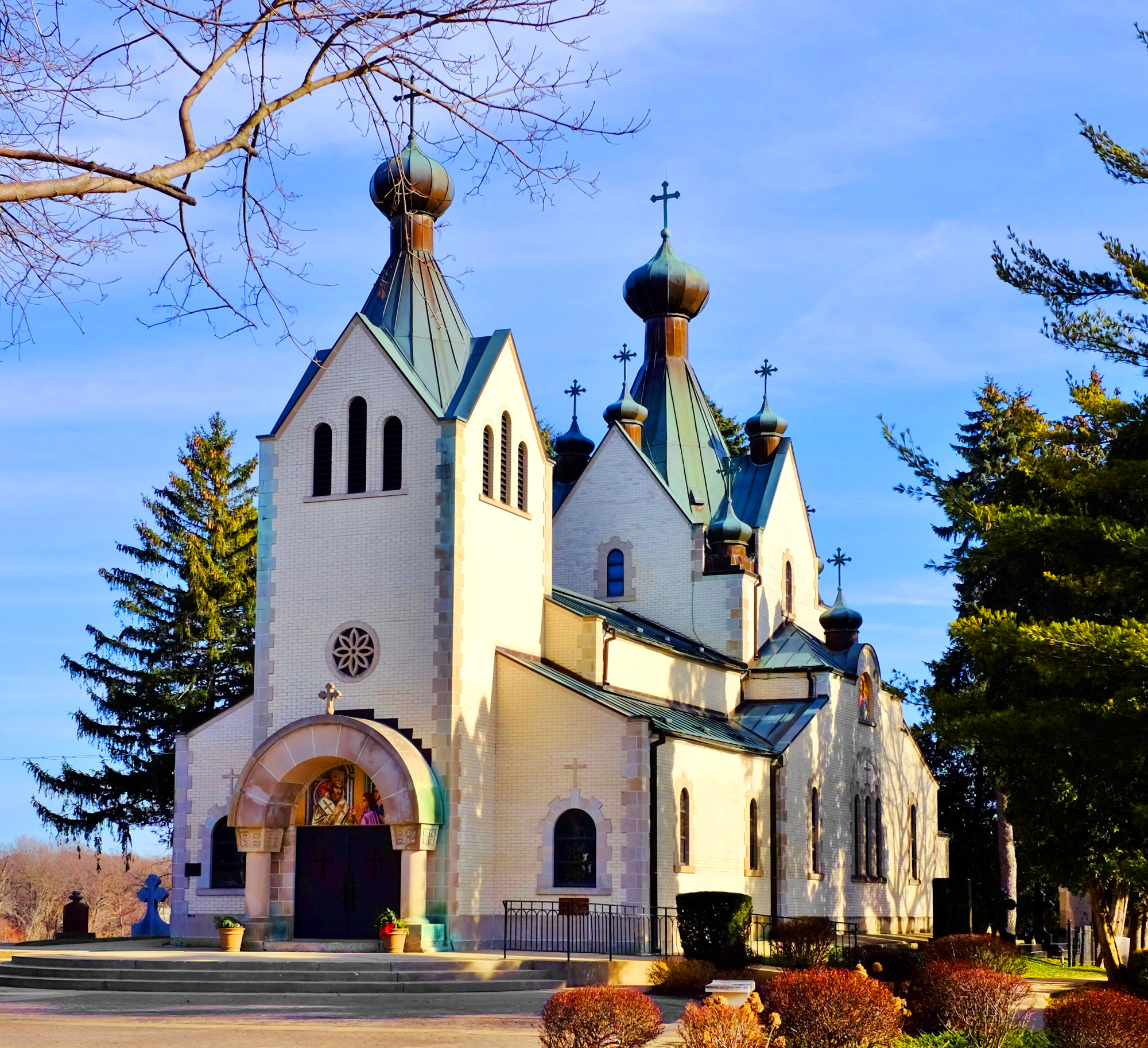
Saint Sava Monastery, Libertyville, Illinois

There are more than twenty Serbian monastic communities in America.

=== United States ===
- Saint Sava Serbian Orthodox Monastery (Libertyville, Illinois)
- New Gračanica Serbian Orthodox Monastery (Third Lake, Illinois)
- Holy Ascension Serbian Orthodox Monastery (Youngwood, Pennsylvania)
- Saint Mark Serbian Orthodox Monastery (Sheffield, Ohio)
- Saint Xenia Serbian Orthodox Monastery (Wildwood, California)
- Saint Paisius Serbian Orthodox Monastery (Safford, Arizona)
- Saint Herman of Alaska Monastery (Platina, California)

=== Canada ===
- Holy Transfiguration Serbian Orthodox Monastery (Milton, Ontario)

== Seminaries and schools ==
- Saint Sava Serbian Orthodox Seminary
- St. Sava Orthodox School
- St. Sava Academy

== See also ==
- Assembly of Canonical Orthodox Bishops of the United States of America
- Assembly of Canonical Orthodox Bishops of Canada
- Assembly of Canonical Orthodox Bishops of Latin America
- Serbian Americans
- Serbian Canadians
- Serbian Argentines
- Serbian Venezuelans

== Sources ==
- Radić, Radmila (2007). "Serbian Christianity". The Blackwell Companion to Eastern Christianity. Malden, MA: Blackwell Publishing. pp. 231–248. ISBN 978-0-470-76639-2.
- Vuković, Sava (1998). History of the Serbian Orthodox Church in America and Canada 1891–1941. Kragujevac: Kalenić.
