= Saint Sava Serbian Orthodox Church (Winnipeg) =

Serbian Orthodox church in Winnipeg, Manitoba

Coordinates: 49°54′20″N 97°05′56″W

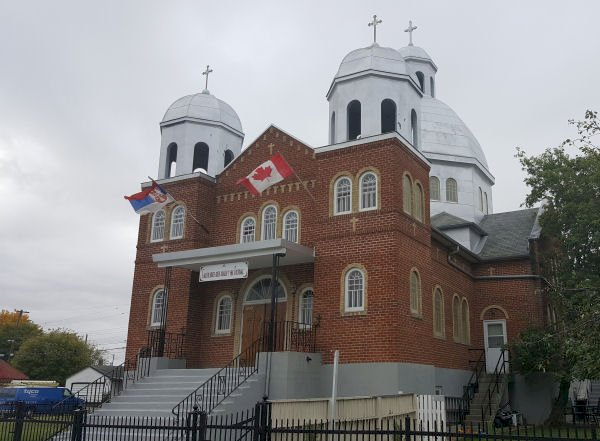
- Saint Sava Serbian Orthodox Church, pictured in 2018
- Saint Sava Serbian Orthodox Church
- Location: 580 Talbot Avenue; Winnipeg, Manitoba; R2L 0R6
- Denomination: Serbian Orthodox Church
- Website: saintsavaserbianorthodoxchurch.ca

History
- Consecrated: September 14, 1997

Architecture
- Architect: Philip Ruh
- Architectural type: Serbo-Byzantine Revival
- Years built: 1948–1952

Administration
- Diocese: Serbian Orthodox Eparchy of Canada

Clergy
- Priest: Fr. Nemanja Lipić

Saint Sava Serbian Orthodox Church (Serbian: Српска православна црква Светог Саве, romanized: Srpska pravoslavna crkva Svetog Save) is an Eastern Orthodox church located in the Talbot-Grey neighbourhood of Elmwood in Winnipeg, Manitoba, Canada. It is dedicated to Saint Sava, the first Archbishop of the Serbian Orthodox Church. The church is also sometimes referred to as the All Serbian Saints Serbian Orthodox Church. It is notable for being the only Serbian Orthodox church in Manitoba. It is under jurisdiction of the Serbian Orthodox Eparchy of Canada of the Serbian Orthodox Church.

== History ==
At the turn of the 20th century the government of the Kingdom of Serbia took an interest in the Serb diaspora. During the height of the World War I, Helen Losanitch Frothingham at the behest of the Serbian government came to visit the Canadian Prairies while on her way to Vancouver and Victoria. Winnipeg Serbs attended the lecture given by Losanitch-Frothingham about the conditions in war-torn Serbia and neighboring lands where Serbs were subjected to conscription in the military of the non-British Allied nations. After the talk, the Serbian anthem was played and a collection for Serbian Relief was taken.

Another Serbian speaker, retired diplomat Čedomilj Mijatović accompanied by one of the most famous British suffragettes, Emmeline Pankhurst visited the Canadian Prairies and British Columbia. With such a well-known person, crowds came to Mijatović's lectures and enabled him to have well-attended lectures and to give interviews to the leading dailies. The dire situation in the Balkans spurred recruitment of Canadian doctors for civilian practice in Serbia while local doctors served in the Serbian Army.

Some fifty Serb families lived in Winnipeg and neighboring St. Boniface at the outbreak of World War I, though not many in number but just as significant as any ethnic pioneer community in the Canadian West at the time.

From 1920 to the start of the World War II, Serb immigrants began to arrive from the former territories of Austria-Hungary (Hungary, Bosnia, Romania) and Ottoman Empire (Kosovo, Macedonia) in an increasing number that would slowly swell the Winnipeg ethnic Serb population.

The next big wave of immigrants came after the war with the arrival of Serb émigrés who fought under General Draža Mihailović to Canada. Attracting them to Winnipeg was a branch of the Serbian National Defense Council in existence since its fledgling beginnings. Although they were in a national political sense united, they desired to have a religious organization.

In all the years after World War II, the Serbs of Winnipeg would ask a Russian priest to officiate in a rented, old wooden Eastern Orthodox church in St. Boniface, the Indian and Metis suburb of Winnipeg. When the heritage building was sold, the Serb community bought a church building from the Presbyterians in 1967 even though they were without a parish priest. No improvements occurred until Bishop Sava (Vuković), on his way to Vancouver, accompanied by Rev. Vladimir Milinković and Protodeacon Dr. Nedeljko Grgurević visited the small community. Bishop Sava held a meeting with the local Serbs regarding the formation of a Church-School Congregation and Parish. Father Bogdan Zjalić visited Winnipeg in 1972 and upon his suggestion, the community center was transformed into a Church-School Congregation. Rev. Zjalić sent a membership list with a petition for the formation of a Church-School Congregation and Parish to Bishop Sava (Vuković) for approval. The church in Winnipeg was consecrated by Bishop Sava on Palm Sunday 1974 and Rev. Srboljub Jocković was appointed parish priest. later, the parish bought a building at Atlantic Avenue and adapted it into a Church. In addition to Father Srboljub Jocković, the following priests served in the parish: Živorad Gavrilović, Syngelos Nikodim Pribojan, Božo Bakajlić, Živorad Subotić, Vitomir Kostić, Slavisa Lekić, Mališa Milovanović.

== See also ==
- Serbian Orthodox Eparchy of Canada
- Serbian Orthodox Church in North and South America
- Serbian Canadians

== Bibliography ==
- Helen Losanitch Frothingham: Mission for Serbia: Letters from America and Canada, 915-1920, published by Walker (1970), page 154.
- Jim Blanchard: Winnipeg's Great War: A City Comes of Age (2010), page 216

== Notes ==
1. The church purchased in 1997 is dedicated to the Assembly of the Serbian Saints but in documents it is still registered under the Saint Sava Church and School Congregation.
