= Saint Sava Church (Douglas, Alaska) =

Coordinates: 58°16′35.6″N 134°23′36.1″W

Saint Sava Church (also spelled "Savva") was a church of the Church of Serbian Mission in Douglas, Alaska. Its construction was due mainly to Fr. Sebastian Dabovich who, in 1902, had been appointed Dean of the Sitka Deanery and the superintendent of Alaskan missions. Although under the Russian Orthodox Church, and a "daughter" parish of St. Nicholas Church in Juneau, Sebastian Dabovich found it important that the Serbians that had come to the area — mostly to work in mining— had a church that was "home" to them. On 23 July 1903, Fr. Sebastian, along with Hieromonk Anthony (Deshkevich-Koribut) and the priest Aleksandar Yaroshevich, consecrated the Church of Saint Sava in Douglas. However, the sparse records that remain of this church indicate that by the 1920s it may have been sitting empty, and in 1937 a fire swept through Douglas, destroying most of the town, including Saint Sava Church. It was not rebuilt.

== History ==
Among those who had made it to Douglas were a group of Serbians, enough to warrant organizing a church. This makes Saint Sava unusual in that it was an Alaskan church not set up as a mission to minister to Native Alaskan peoples, but rather to a group who were already Orthodox Christians. This is an early example of the attempt of Bishop Tikhon to set up churches that represented other Orthodox nationalities in the diaspora, in particular the Syro-Arab mission (led by Bishop Raphael Hawaweeny), and the Serbian Mission, which Archimandrite Sebastian Dabovich would later be named to lead. The land was donated by the Treadwell Gold Mine Company, and though this church was part of the "Russian Mission", a donation for the church's construction was sent from the Council of Bishops in Serbia. The parish members themselves provided funding for various repairs over the years, including a new Church foundation in 1915 and two cemeteries. The building was a fairly simple wooden structure and had a single altar.

Following a devastating fire in the town, Douglas' population also dropped, and the 1920 census recorded only 919 people still living there. By some time in the 1920s, the church was not regularly used. In 1937, fire again burned many buildings Douglas, and the St. Sava Church burned to the ground. It was not subsequently rebuilt.

== See also ==
- Sebastian Dabovich
- Mardarije Uskokovich
- Nikolaj Velimirović
- John Kochurov
- Theophilus Pashkovsky
- Boris Pash
- Alexis Toth
