= Serbian Orthodox Eparchy of Canada =

Diocese of the Serbian Orthodox Church

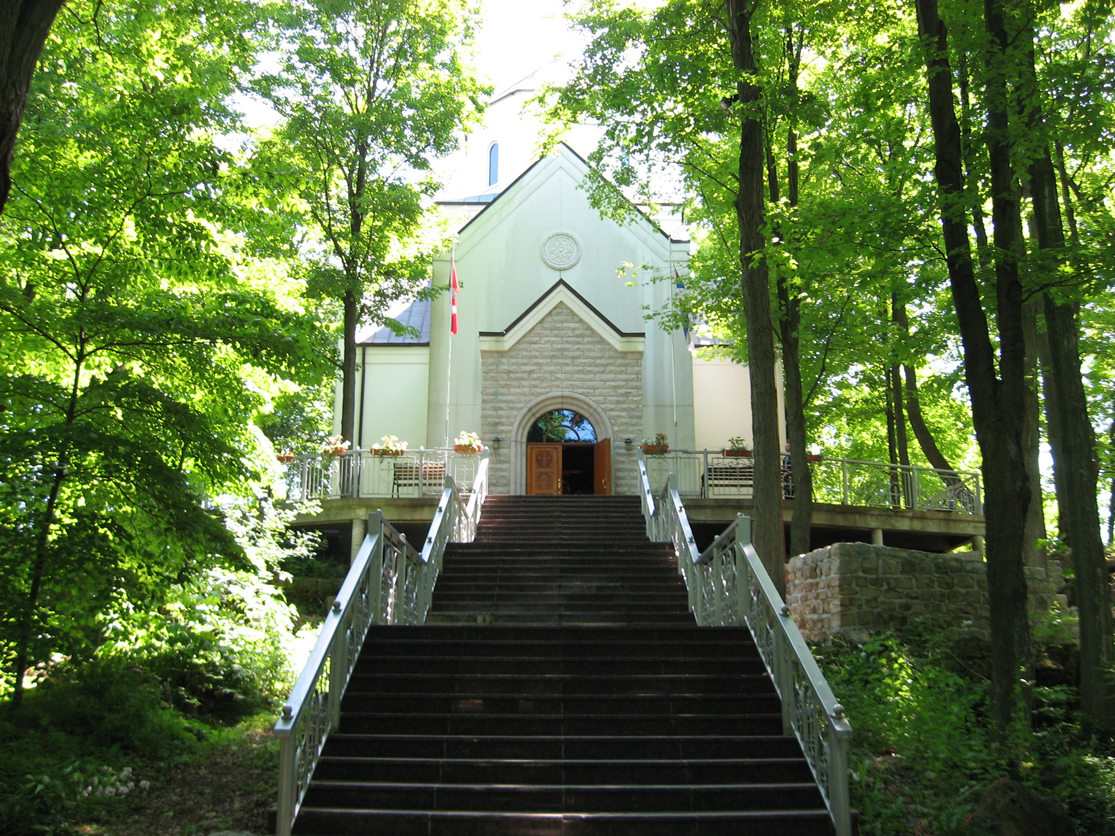
- Holy Transfiguration Monastery, the diocesan headquarters

Location
- Territory: Canada
- Headquarters: Holy Transfiguration Monastery, Milton, Ontario

Information
- Denomination: Eastern Orthodox
- Sui iuris church: Serbian Orthodox Church
- Established: 1983
- Cathedral: Saint Nicholas Cathedral, Hamilton, Ontario
- Language: Church Slavonic, Serbian, English

Current leadership
- Bishop: Mitrofan Kodić

Map

Website
- Serbian Orthodox Eparchy of Canada

The Serbian Orthodox Eparchy of Canada (Serbian: Српска православна епархија канадска, romanized: Srpska pravoslavna eparhija kanadska) is a diocese (eparchy) of the Serbian Orthodox Church, covering Canada.

== History ==
The Serbian Orthodox Eparchy in the United States and Canada was established in 1921. In 1963, it was reorganized into three eparchies and in 1983, a fourth eparchy was created specifically for the Canada at the behest of Sava Vuković, the then-bishop of Eastern America and Canada. This followed a period of growth in Serb immigrants to Canada following World War II, as well as a desire in decades prior for the Serbian Orthodox clergy to reach their parishioners more easily. In 1984, Georgije Đokić was elected as its first bishop. Since 1987, the Serbian Orthodox Eparchy of Canada owns and operates a diocesan magazine called Istočnik.

== Structure ==
The Serbian Orthodox Eparchy of Eastern America comprises 34 parishes. Its headquarters and bishop's residence are in Campbellville, Milton, Ontario.

The diocese operates, among others, the following churches and monasteries:

=== Churches ===
- Saint Nicholas Serbian Orthodox Cathedral (Hamilton)
- Saint Sava Serbian Orthodox Church (Toronto)
- Saint Sava Serbian Orthodox Church (Winnipeg)
- Holy Trinity Serbian Orthodox Church (Montreal)
- Holy Trinity Serbian Orthodox Church (Regina)
- Saint Stefan Serbian Orthodox Church (Ottawa)
- All Serbian Saints Serbian Orthodox Church (Mississauga)
- Saint Arsenije Sremac Serbian Orthodox Church (Whitby)
- Saint Petka Serbian Orthodox Church (Lakeshore)
- Saints Peter and Paul Serbian Orthodox Church (Sudbury)

=== Monasteries ===
- Holy Transfiguration Serbian Orthodox Monastery (Milton, Ontario)

== Gallery ==
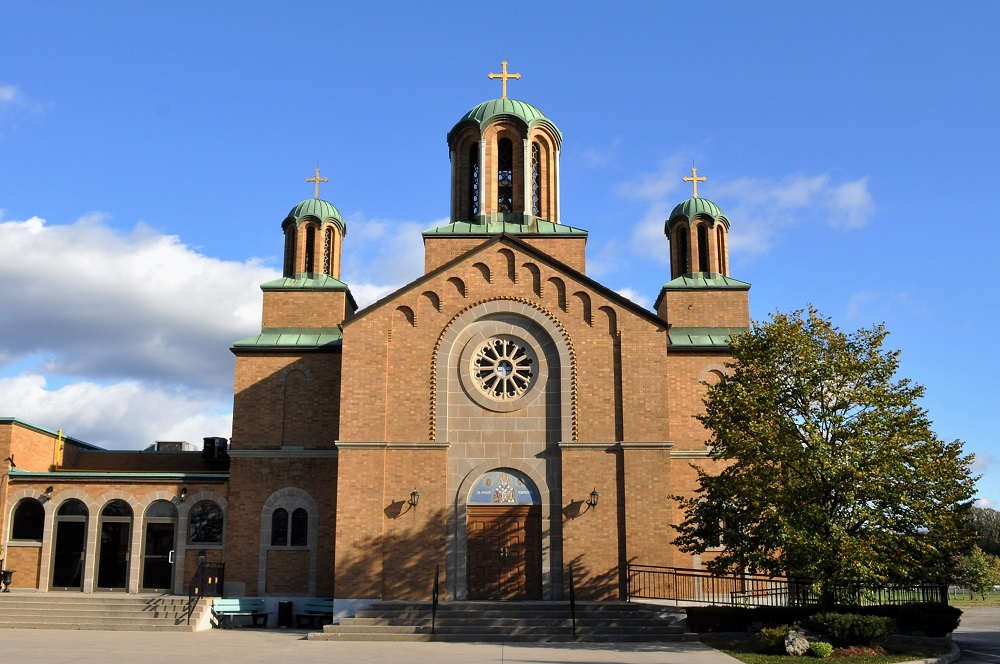
Saint Nicholas Cathedral (Hamilton)

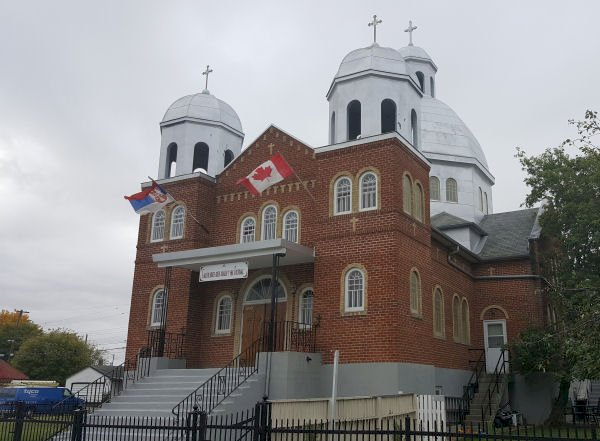
Saint Sava Church (Winnipeg)

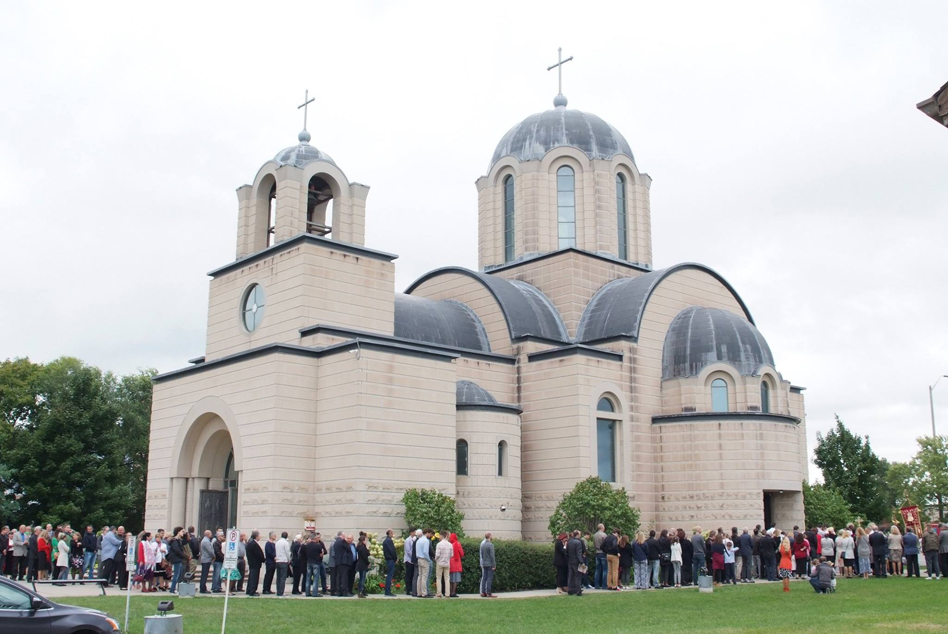
All Serbian Saints Church (Mississauga)

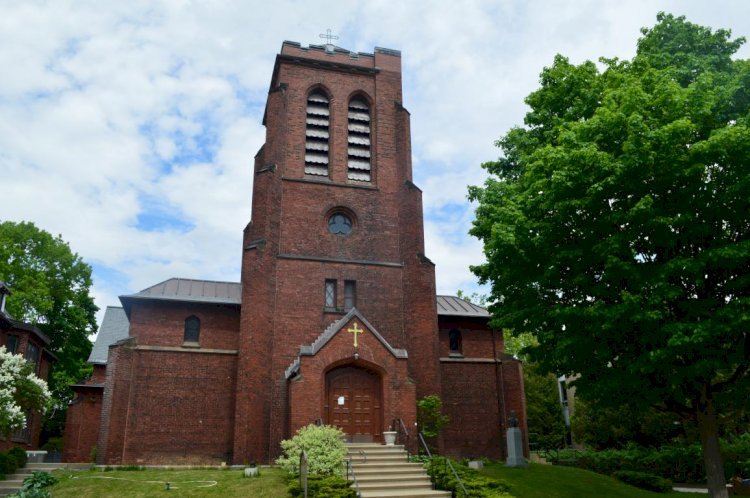
Holy Trinity Church (Montreal)
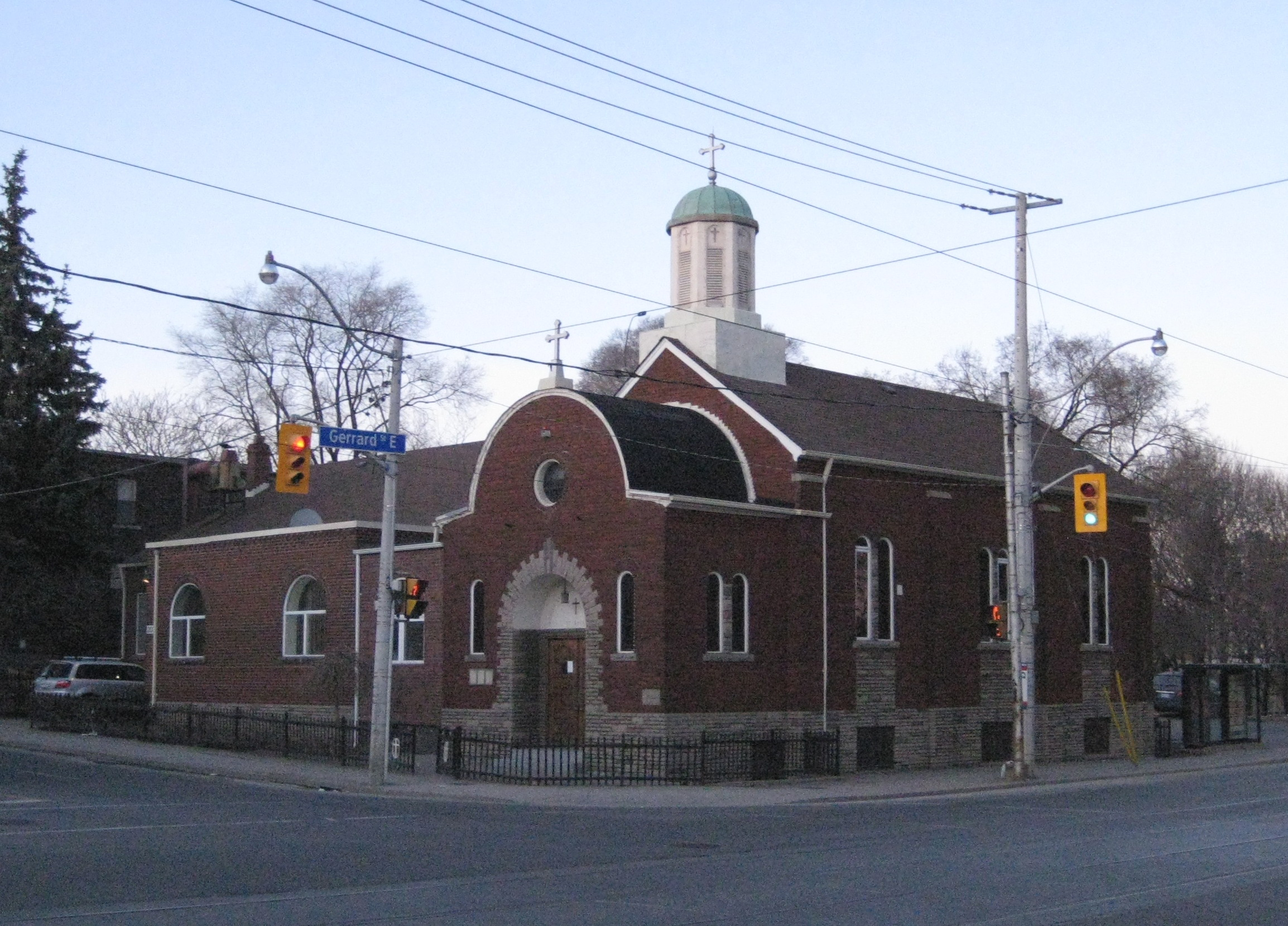
Saint Sava Church (Toronto)

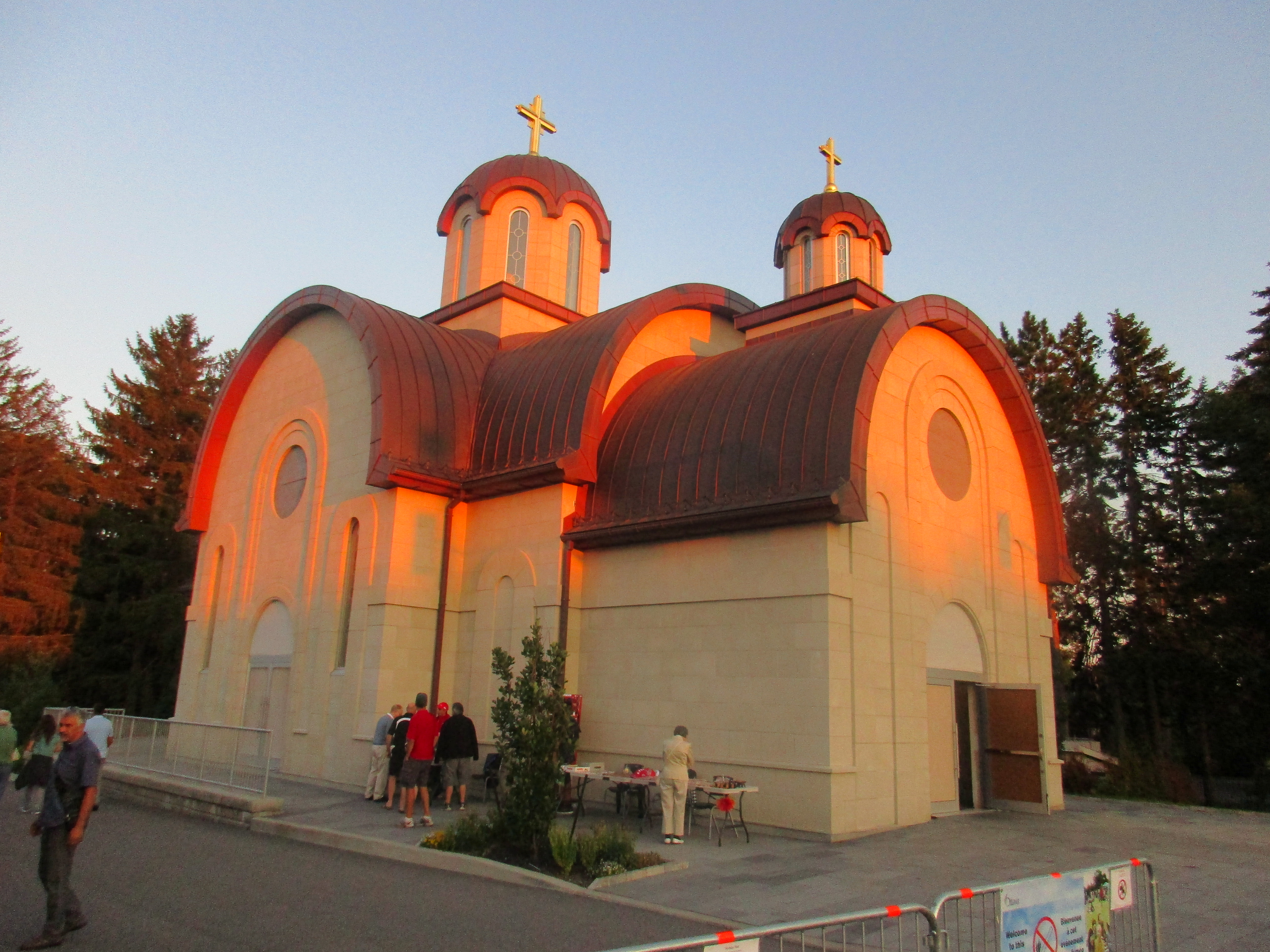
Saint Stefan Church (Ottawa)

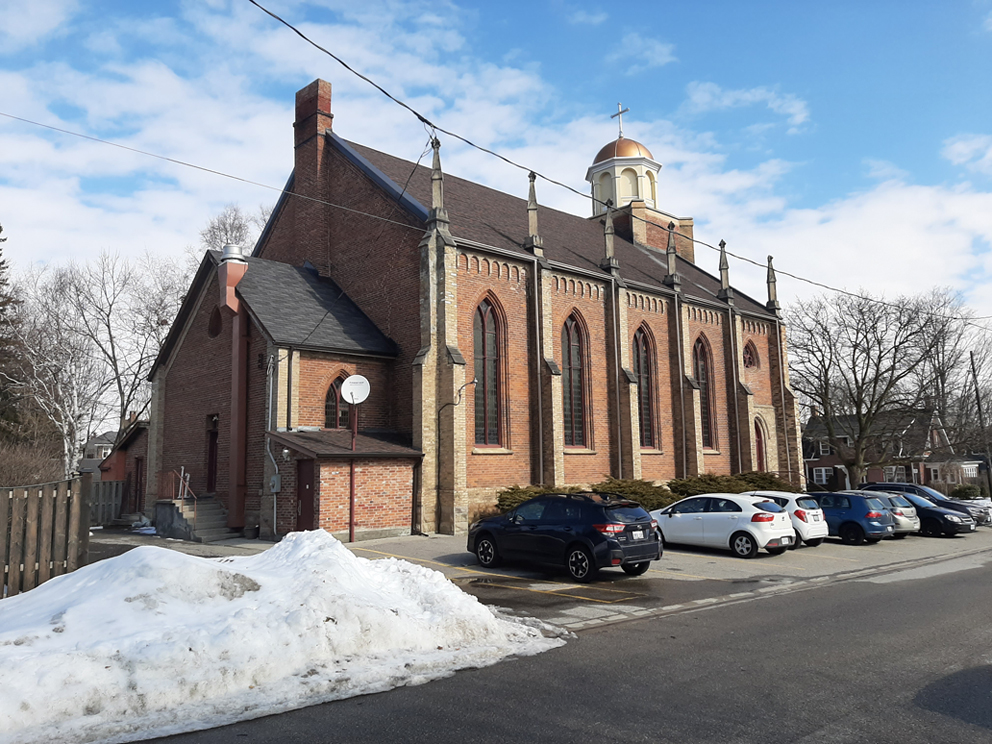
Saint Arsenije Sremac Church (Whitby)

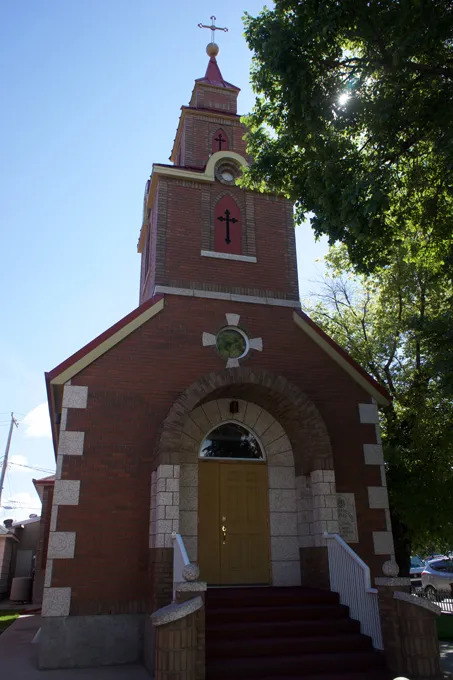
Holy Trinity Church (Regina)
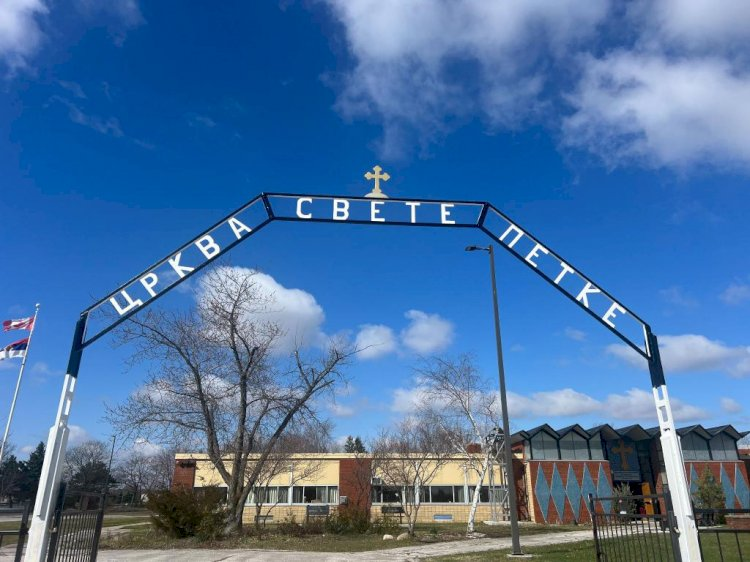
Saint Petka Church (Lakeshore)

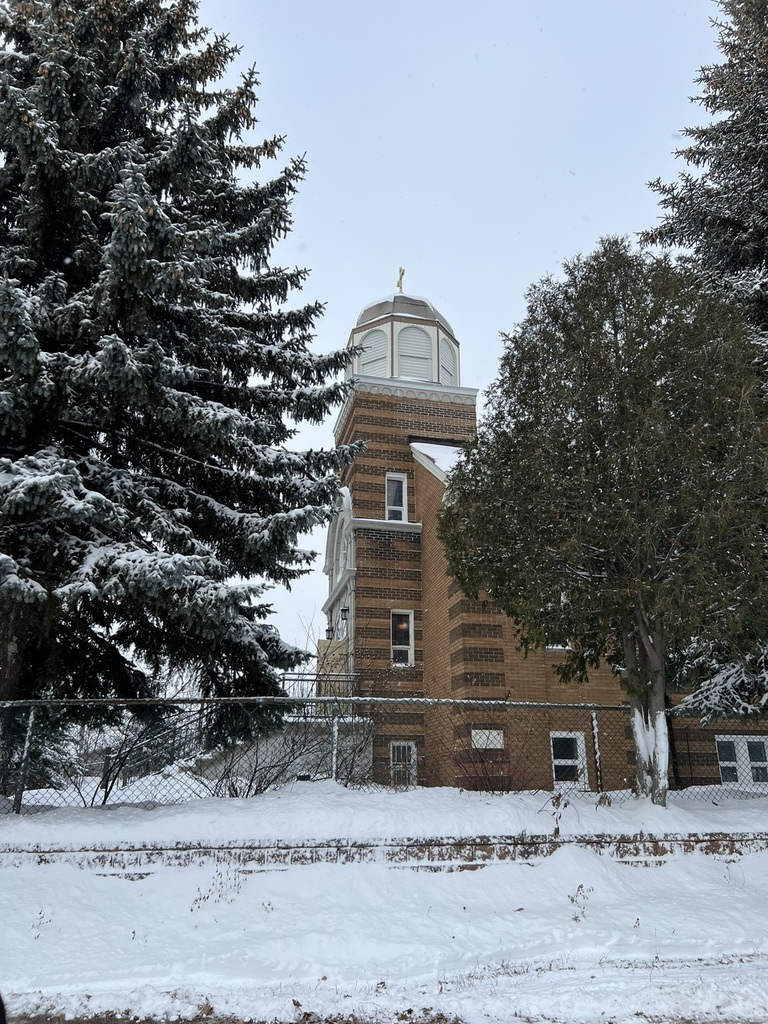
Saints Peter and Paul Church (Sudbury)

== See also ==
- Serbian Orthodox Church in North and South America
- Assembly of Canonical Orthodox Bishops of Canada
- Eparchies and metropolitanates of the Serbian Orthodox Church
- Serbian Canadians

== Sources ==
- Vuković, Sava (1998). History of the Serbian Orthodox Church in America and Canada 1891–1941. Kragujevac: Kalenić.
