= Saint Sava Serbian Orthodox Church (Toronto) =

Serbian Orthodox church in Toronto, Ontario

Coordinates: 43°39′50.3″N 79°21′32.7″W

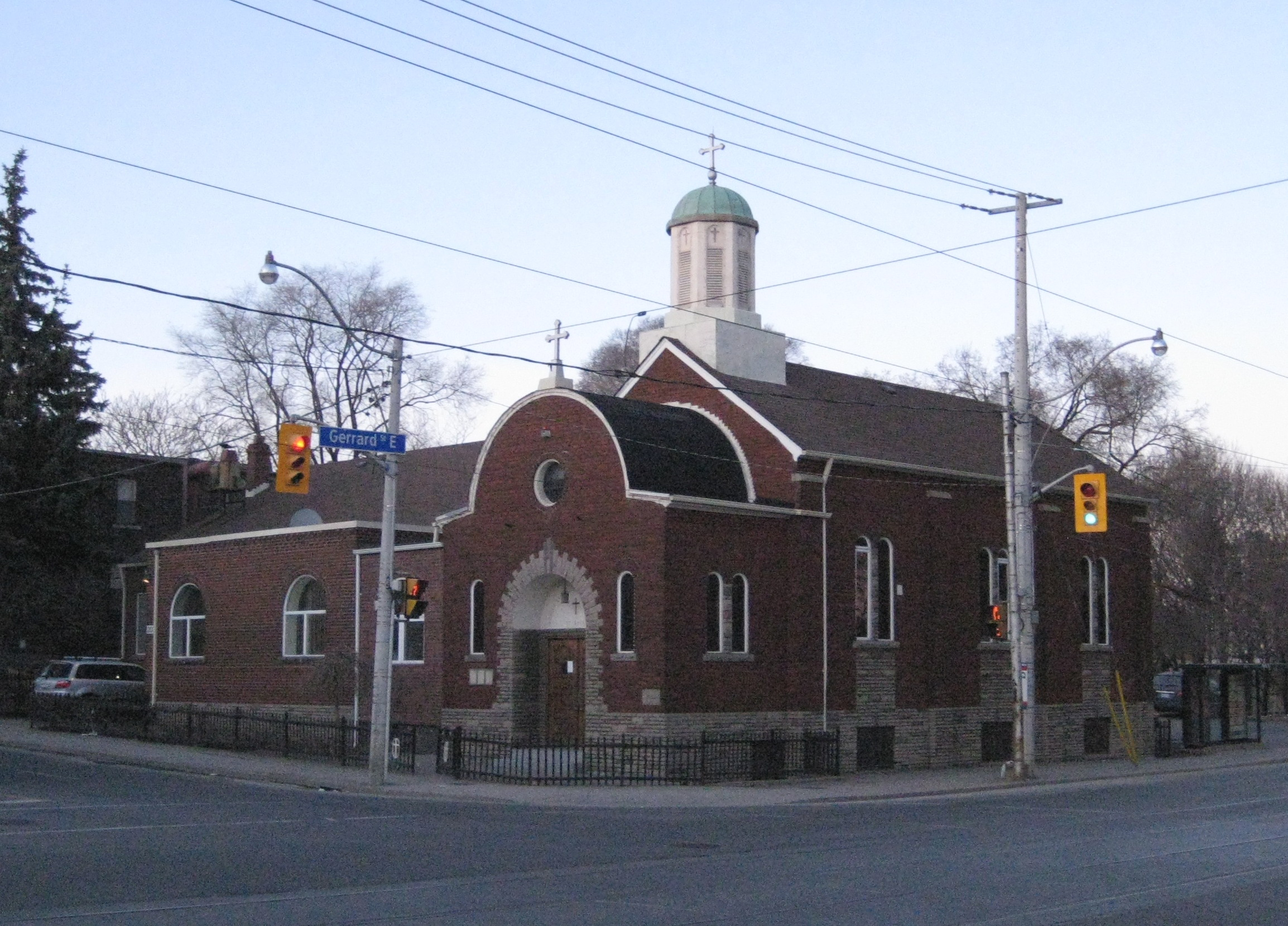
- Saint Sava Serbian Orthodox Church, pictured in 2010
- Saint Sava Serbian Orthodox Church
- Location: 203 River Street; Toronto, Ontario; M5A 3P9
- Denomination: Serbian Orthodox Church
- Website: svetisavatoronto.org

History
- Consecrated: May 22, 1955

Architecture
- Architect: Petar Popović
- Architectural type: Serbo-Byzantine Revival
- Years built: 1953–1955
- Groundbreaking: June 10, 1953

Administration
- Diocese: Serbian Orthodox Eparchy of Canada

Clergy
- Priest(s): Fr. Jovica Ćetković; Fr. Đurađ Kojić
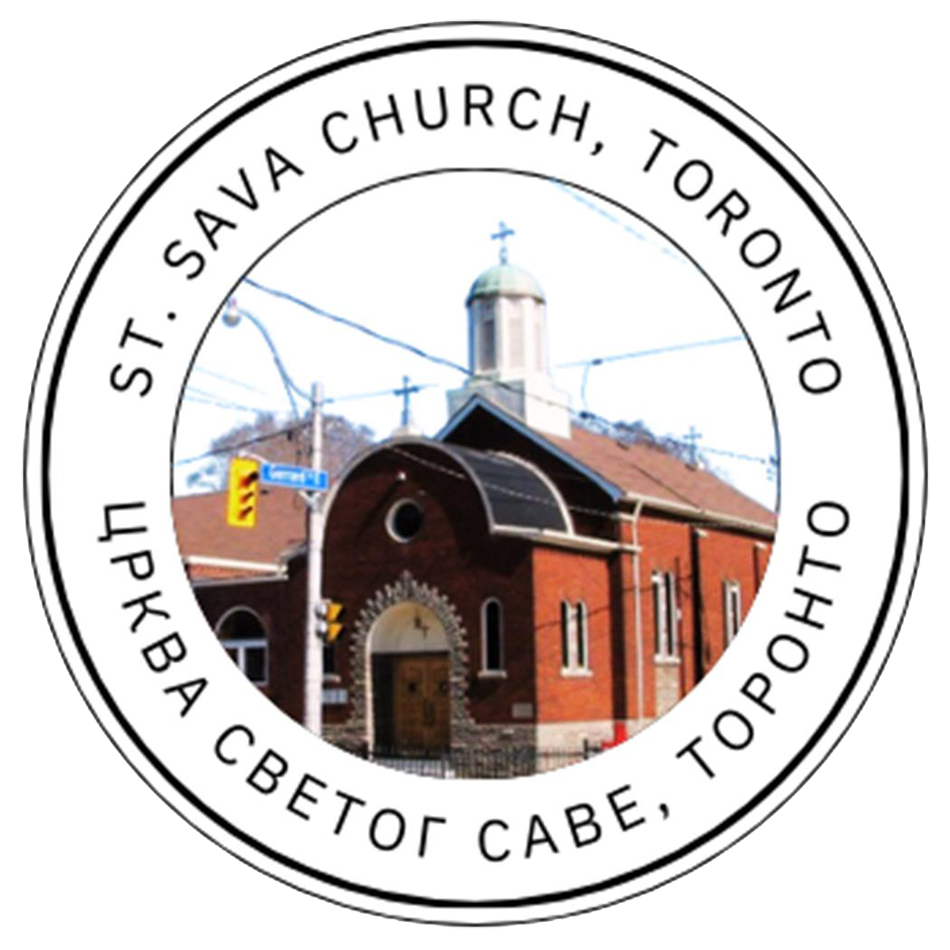

Saint Sava Serbian Orthodox Church (Serbian: Српска православна црква Светог Саве, romanized: Srpska pravoslavna crkva Svetog Save) is an Eastern Orthodox church located in the Cabbagetown neighbourhood of Toronto, Ontario, Canada. It is under jurisdiction of the Serbian Orthodox Eparchy of Canada of the Serbian Orthodox Church and is dedicated to Saint Sava, the first Archbishop of the Serbian Orthodox Church. The church is the oldest Serbian Orthodox church in Toronto and is commonly referred to as the mother church of the Serbian Canadian community in Toronto.

== History ==
The church is located on the same site (the northeast corner of River Street and Gerrard Street East) as the Gerrard Street Methodist (from 1925, United) Church which was built in 1880 and demolished in 1939 when the parish was merged with Saint Enoch United Church.

The construction of the Saint Sava church and church hall began on June 10, 1953, and the cornerstone was consecrated by Bishop Dionisije Milivojević on August 22, 1953. The architect of the church and church hall was Petar "Pera" Popović, and the building contractor was Velimir "Velja" Relja. The single-nave church was built in the Romanesque style and adapted into a Serbo-Byzantine Revival style. It has a small semicircular altar-apse in the east while in the west is the main entrance to the church with a small vestibule. A small round dome also rises above the roof on the west side of the church. The church has three crosses. The church hall is attached directly to the north side of the church, through which one can also enter the church.

The first service was held in the church hall on Easter, April 25, 1954, and the foundation of the church was consecrated on September 5, 1954 by Bishop (later canonized as a saint) Nikolaj Velimirović.

The church was completed and consecrated on May 22, 1955, by Bishop Dionisije Milivojević. Grand Duchess Olga (sister of Russian Emperor Nicholas II) attended the celebration and banquet, donating an icon of Saint Alexander Nevski made by her own hand. Also present at the banquet were Metro Toronto councilor Joseph Cornish and Speaker of the House of Commons Roland Michener. The iconostasis of the church, the work of Simo Temovsky, was consecrated in 1956.

In 2005, the church was registered as a heritage building by the Ontario Heritage Trust as part of the Cabbagetown South Heritage Conservation District.

The church has been visited by a Patriarch of the Serbian Orthodox Church on three occasions: Patriarch Irinej visited the church in 2015 and 2016 while Patriarch Porfirije visited in 2024 to commemorate the seventieth anniversary of its existence as a Toronto parish and community.

The church hall houses the Milivoje Petković Memorial Library.

== See also ==
- Serbian Orthodox Eparchy of Canada
- Serbian Orthodox Church in North and South America
- Serbian Canadians
