= Georgije Đokić =

Bishop of the Serbian Orthodox Church

His Grace Georgije (Đokić)
- Bishop emeritus
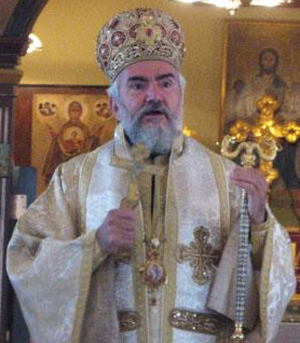
- Church: Serbian Orthodox Church
- Diocese: Diocese of Canada
- Appointed: May 16, 1984
- Installed: October 14, 1984
- Retired: May 20, 2015
- Predecessor: Christopher Kovacevich (administrator)
- Successor: Patriarch Irinej (administrator)

Orders
- Ordination: February 11, 1971 by Sergije (Paraklis)
- Consecration: July 8, 1984 by Serbian Patriarch German

Personal details
- Born: Đorđe Đokić; May 6, 1949 (age 77) Crnjelovo Gornje, PR Bosnia and Herzegovina, FPR Yugoslavia
- Denomination: Orthodox Christian
- Residence: Campbellville, Ontario
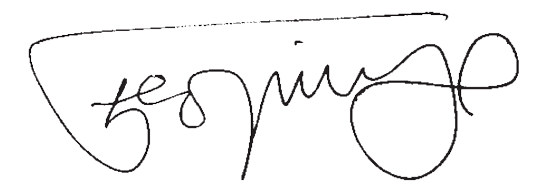
- Signature

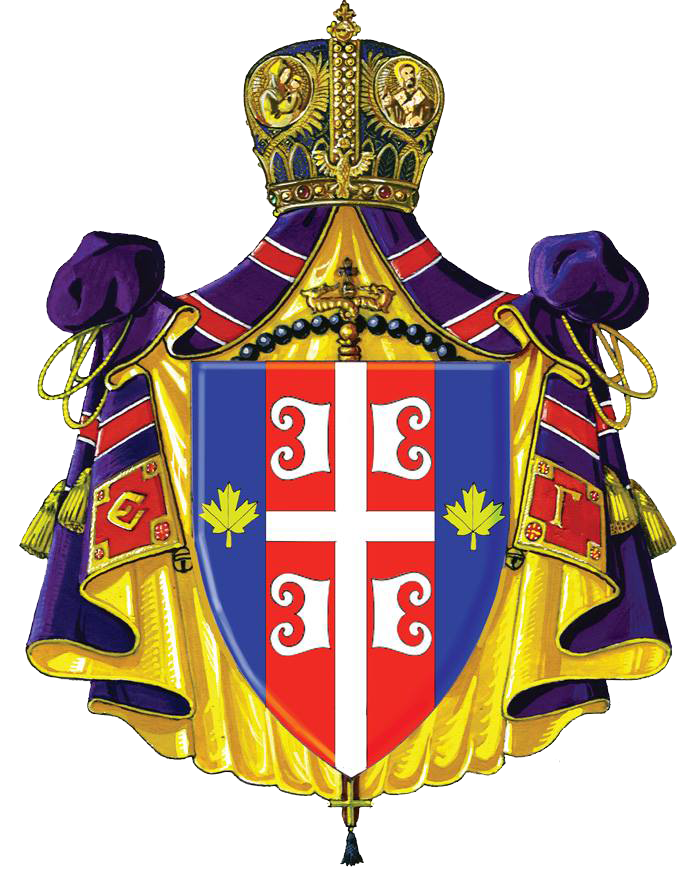
- Coat of arms

Georgije Đokić (Serbian Cyrillic: Георгије Ђокић; born May 6, 1949) is a retired Serbian Orthodox bishop who served as the head of the Serbian Orthodox Eparchy of Canada from 1984 until May 20, 2015.

== Biography ==
He was born on May 6, 1949 as Đorđe Đokić in the village of Crnjelovo Gornje near Bijeljina to father Krsto and mother Krunija (née Arsenović). His brother Konstantin is also a retired bishop having served as the Bishop of Central Europe from 1991 to 2013, his other brother Ljubomir is a retired priest who served in Vršani near Bijeljina, and his sister Nadežda is a nun in the Tavna monastery.

From 1967 to 1969, he was part of the first generation of students at a two-year monastic school in the Ostrog monastery at a time when the manager and professor was hieromonk Irinej (Gavrilović), who was later the Patriarch of the Serbian Orthodox Church. Pupils of the same generation were also future bishops: Bishop of Britain and Scandinavia Dositej (Motika), Bishop of Šumadija Jovan (Mladenović) and Bishop of Valjevo Milutin. He served from 1971 to 1982 as a hieromonk and clergyman in the Tavna monastery. At that time, he graduated from the Theological Seminary of Sremski Karlovci, and the Faculty of Theology at the University of Belgrade.

=== As bishop ===
As a syncellus, he was appointed Bishop of Canada on May 16, 1984. Patriarch German consecrated him on July 8, 1984, in St. Michael's Cathedral in Belgrade with the cooperation of the Bishop of Timok Milutin (Stojadinović) and the Bishop of Zvornik and Tuzla Vasilije. He was enthroned in the Saint Nicholas Serbian Orthodox Cathedral in Hamilton on the day of the Intercession of the Theotokos on October 14, 1984. The enthronement was performed by the Bishop of East America and Canada Christopher who on that occasion officially handed over the Canadian diocese.

He was a member of the central body for the construction of the Church of Saint Sava in Belgrade.

Under his leadership, eleven new churches and chapels were consecrated as well as the first Serbian monastery, the Holy Transfiguration Monastery in Milton. He re-founded the local Circle of Serbian Sisters, brought fifteen new priests to Canada, launched the diocesan magazine and diocesan publishing house Istočnik in 1987, and founded the Holy Transfiguration monastery library, among other things.

Bishop Georgije was also the first bishop of the renewed Eparchy of Mileševa from 1992 to 1994. On June 1, 2014, he was awarded the Order of the White Angel of the first degree, the highest decoration of the Eparchy of Mileševa, by the Bishop of Mileševa Filaret (Mićević) after a joint service in the Mileševa Monastery. 2014 also marked his thirtieth year as Bishop of Canada.

After numerous complaints from the clergy and the faithful, the Holy Assembly of Bishops of the Serbian Orthodox Church temporarily dismissed Bishop Georgije from the throne of the Eparchy of Canada on April 28, 2015. The accusations concerned his moral life and alleged financial abuse with candles. The decision on dismissal was confirmed by the Holy Assembly of Bishops on May 20, 2015. The case reached Canadian courts but on September 12, 2018, the Crown Attorney's Office announced before the Ontario Court of Justice in Milton that it was withdrawing fraud charges against Bishop Georgije and not proceeding with the charges because there was "no reasonable prospect of conviction".

== Published books ==
- Pečat mojega vladičanstva, 2006
- Kovčežić uspomena, 2011
- Deveto blaženstvo, 2020

Serbian Orthodox Church titles
New creation	Bishop of Canada; 1984 – 2015	Succeeded by Mitrofan Kodić
