= Saint Elijah the Prophet Serbian Orthodox Church, Coober Pedy =

Serbian Orthodox church in Coober Pedy, South Australia

Saint Elijah the Prophet Serbian Orthodox Church
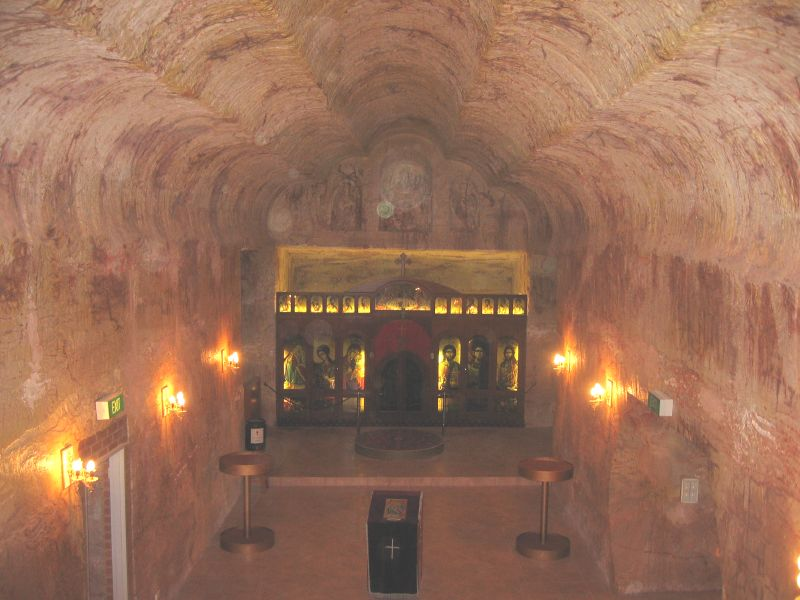
- Saint Elijah the Prophet Serbian Orthodox Church
- 29.012838°S 134.773298°E
- Location: Coober Pedy, South Australia
- Country: Australia
- Denomination: Serbian Orthodox Church

History
- Founded: 1993
- Dedication: Saint Elijah
- Consecrated: 2 August 1993

Architecture
- Functional status: Active
- Groundbreaking: 1993

Specifications
- Length: 30 metres (98 ft)
- Width: 5.3 metres (17 ft)
- Height: 7 metres (23 ft)
- Materials: Sandstone

Administration
- Diocese: Serbian Orthodox Metropolitanate of Australia and New Zealand

The Saint Elijah the Prophet Serbian Orthodox Church (Serbian: Српска православна црква Светог Илије Пророка, romanized: Srpska pravoslavna crkva Svetog Ilije Proroka an Eastern Orthodox church located in Coober Pedy, South Australia. Built in 1993, it is under jurisdiction of the Serbian Orthodox Metropolitanate of Australia and New Zealand of the Serbian Orthodox Church and is dedicated to Saint Elijah. The church is a popular tourist attraction because of its underground location. The whole church complex, with a church, a community hall, a parish house and a religious school, is carved in the sandstone between 3 and 17 metres under the ground level.

== History ==
The church was built by Serbian Australians who settled in Coober Pedy as opal miners. Because of the hot climate, it was decided to build a church under the ground. The digging of the community hall begun in June 1992, and was finished in a month. The digging of the church itself began in February 1993, and was finished in August 1993, and consecrated on St Elijah's Day (2 August [O.S. 20 July] 1993). All work was done by the volunteers.

== Architecture ==
The church is 30 metres (98 ft) long, 5.3 metres (17 ft) wide, and 7 metres (23 ft) high, and is completely carved in the sandstone. The ceiling window is covered with stained glass. The floor is 17 metres (56 ft) under the ground level in the deepest point, and 3 metres (9.8 ft) under the ground level at the shallowest point. The church has a gallery with a baptismal font and the altar. The iconostasis is made of glass. The interior walls are covered with bas reliefs of saints carved in stone. The whole complex contains the church, the community hall, priest's home and the religious school, all carved under the ground.

== See also ==
- Serbian Orthodox Metropolitanate of Australia and New Zealand
- Serbian Australians
