= Saint Nicholas Serbian Orthodox Church (Geelong) =

Serbian Orthodox church in Geelong, Australia

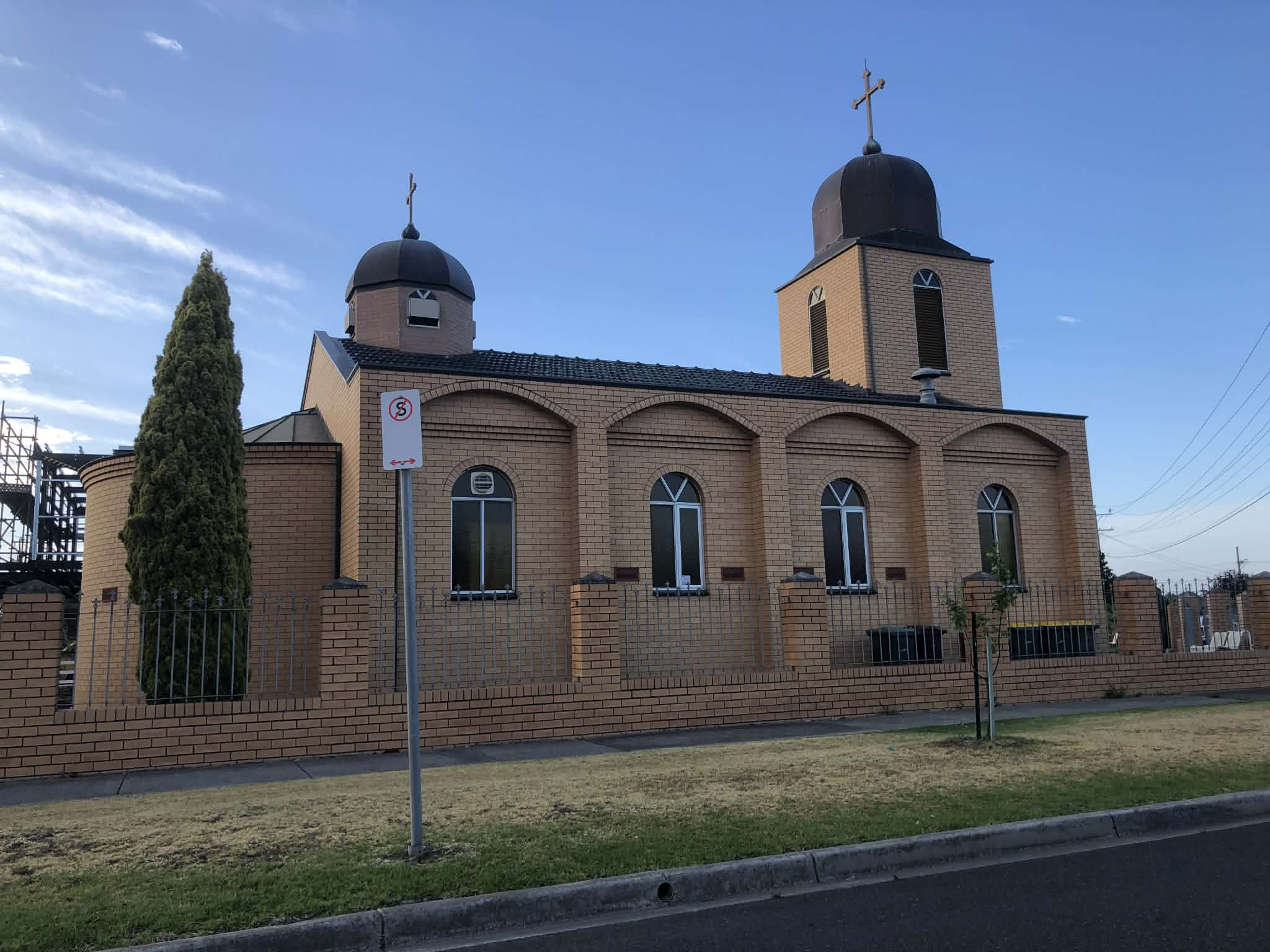

- Location in the City of Greater Geelong
- 38°07′04″S 144°19′53″E
- Location: 124 Ballarat Rd, Bell Park (Geelong), Victoria
- Country: Australia
- Denomination: Serbian Orthodox Church

History
- Status: Church
- Founded: 1964
- Dedication: Saint Nicholas

Architecture
- Functional status: Active
- Architectural type: Church
- Years built: 1961-1964

Administration
- Diocese: Serbian Orthodox Metropolitanate of Australia and New Zealand

Saint Nicholas Serbian Orthodox Church (Serbian: Српска православна црква Светог Николе, romanized: Srpska pravoslavna crkva Svetog Nikole) is an Eastern Orthodox church located in the Geelong suburb of Bell Park, Victoria, Australia. It is under jurisdiction of the Serbian Orthodox Metropolitanate of Australia and New Zealand of the Serbian Orthodox Church and is dedicated to Saint Nicholas.

The church has functioned as both a religious and cultural centre for Serbian Australians in the Geelong region since 1964.

== History ==
The Serbian Orthodox parish of Saint Nicholas in Geelong was established to meet the spiritual needs of Serbian Orthodox faithful living in the area, particularly following post-war Serbian migration to Australia. Before the formal organisation of church life in Geelong, local Serbian residents established the Fraternal Aid Association, whose primary aim was mutual assistance. The association prioritised support for sick and disabled Serbs, as well as those who remained in displaced persons camps in Europe and were unable or unwilling to emigrate. It also organised major religious and cultural celebrations, including Christmas Eve, Christmas Day, Saint Sava's Day, and Vidovdan. During this early period, the Anglican Church made its churches and halls available for Orthodox services and community programmes. Religious services for the Serbian Orthodox faithful in Geelong were initially conducted by priests Slavo Nićetin, followed by Miroslav Jovanović and later Savo Čupać.

Recognising the need for a formally organised parish, Serbian residents of Geelong convened a founding assembly on 9 February 1958, at which they resolved to establish a church-school municipality. At the assembly, members were formally registered, a membership fee was set, and the first governing board was elected, with Vukosav Tasić chosen as president. On the same day, the Majka Jugović Circle of Serbian Sisters was founded, and remained active until 1961. The assembly also authorised the newly elected board to seek a suitable site for the construction of a church and parish hall, and it was decided that the church would be dedicated to Saint Nicholas.

Shortly thereafter, an extraordinary assembly elected a new governing board, headed by Dragoljub Nikolić. A parcel of land was subsequently purchased for the construction of the church and church hall. Prior to the erection of the permanent church building, a shed was constructed on the site for the storage of materials and tools, and it was also used for meetings and the celebration of worship services.

The foundations of the church were laid and consecrated on 30 September 1961 by Bishop Anthony of the Russian Orthodox Church Outside Russia (ROCOR) In the same year, a folklore group and a Sunday school were established within the parish, with classes initially held in a barracks located on the church property.

During the division within the Serbian Orthodox Church in 1963, an extraordinary annual assembly of the parish resolved to request admission to the jurisdiction of the American-Canadian Diocese. The church was completed in 1964. The women's section of the parish was formally organised on 27 February 1965 and remained active until July 1975, when the Majka Jugović Circle of Serbian Sisters was reactivated. The organisation has continued its activities since that time.

On 21 December 2025, Metropolitan Siluan (Mrakić), head of the Serbian Orthodox Metropolitanate of Australia and New Zealand since 2016, visited the church.

== See also ==
- Serbian Orthodox Metropolitanate of Australia and New Zealand
- Serbian Australians
