= Botica (surname) =

Botica is a surname. Notable people with the surname include:

- Ben Botica (born 1989), New Zealand rugby union player
- Frano Botica (born 1963), New Zealand-Croatian rugby coach and player
- Fred Botica (born 1947), Australian radio host
- Jacob Botica (born 1993), New Zealand rugby union player
- John Botica (born 1953), New Zealand artist
- Nives Botica Redmayne, New Zealand academic
