= Botica =

Botica may refer to:

- Botica (surname), a family name
- Botánica, less commonly botica, a Latin American religious goods store
