= SNZ =

SNZ may refer to:

== Organizations ==
- Scouts New Zealand, the Scout Association of New Zealand
- SeaLink New Zealand, a group of companies including Captain Cook Cruises and Kangaroo Island SeaLink
- Squash New Zealand, the governing body of squash in New Zealand
- Swimming New Zealand, the governing body of swimming in New Zealand
- Statistics New Zealand, the department that collects statistics related to the economy, population and society of New Zealand
- Squirrel Nut Zippers, American retro swing band during 1990s

== People ==
- Sergei Nikolayevich Zhukov (born 1967), Russian professional football coach and former player
- Sultanah Nur Zahirah (born 1973), HRH Sultanah Nur Zahirah, The Sultanah
- Stephen N. Zack (born 1947), President of American Bar Association 2010–2011

== Ethnic groups ==
- Samoan New Zealanders, Samoan immigrants in New Zealand
- Serbian New Zealanders, NZ citizens of Serbian descent or Serbia-born people who reside in New Zealand
- Spanish New Zealanders, NZ citizens and residents of Spanish descent, or people who were born in Spain and emigrated to New Zealand

== Entertainment ==
- SNZ (group), Brazilian pop music group
- Squirrel Nut Zippers, American swing and jazz band

== Other uses ==
- Saudi-Iraq Neutral Zone
- Stadium New Zealand, national stadium proposed for Auckland's waterfront to host the 2011 Rugby World Cup
