= Serbian New Zealanders =

Новозеландски Срби Novozelandski Srbi

Total population
- 1,347 (2023)

Regions with significant populations
- Auckland, Wellington, and Christchurch

Languages
- New Zealand English and Serbian

Religion
- Eastern Orthodoxy (Serbian Orthodox Church)

Related ethnic groups
- Serbian Australians

Serbian New Zealanders or Serb New Zealanders are New Zealand citizens of ethnic Serb descent or Serbia-born people living in New Zealand.

== History ==
Serbs began to immigrate to New Zealand, mostly individually, during the second half of the 19th century. In the 1940s, Serbian New Zealander potter Jovan Rancich designed many of the products of the Crown Lynn pottery range.

There was a surge in Serbian immigrants after World War II, mostly recorded as political immigrants. It was not until 1968 that the St. Sava Orthodox Church and School was founded in Wellington. They intended to build a church, however, some of the more active members died, and some began to move to Australia for economic reason. Due to small size of the Serb population in New Zealand, the community church was not built, and in 1981, the St. Sava Orthodox Church and School were abolished.

The largest number of Serbs immigrated after the outbreak of the Yugoslav Wars in the 1990s. For the most part, they were highly qualified professionals. Nowadays, there are two Serbian Orthodox churches in New Zealand, in Wellington and Auckland.

== Notable people ==
- John Botica – artist
- Antonija Mitrović – computer scientist
- Jana Radosavljević – football player
- Verica Rupar – academic
- Marko Stamenić – football player, paternal Serb descent
- James Stosic – rugby player, paternal Serb descent
- Nenad Vučinić – basketball coach

== See also ==
- Immigration to New Zealand
- European New Zealanders
- Europeans in Oceania
- Serb diaspora
- Serbian Orthodox Eparchy of Australia and New Zealand
