= St George Macedonian Orthodox Church, Fitzroy =

St George Macedonian Orthodox Church
- Македонска Православна Црква „Св. Ѓорѓи“ Makedonska Pravoslavna Crkva „Sveti Ǵorǵi“
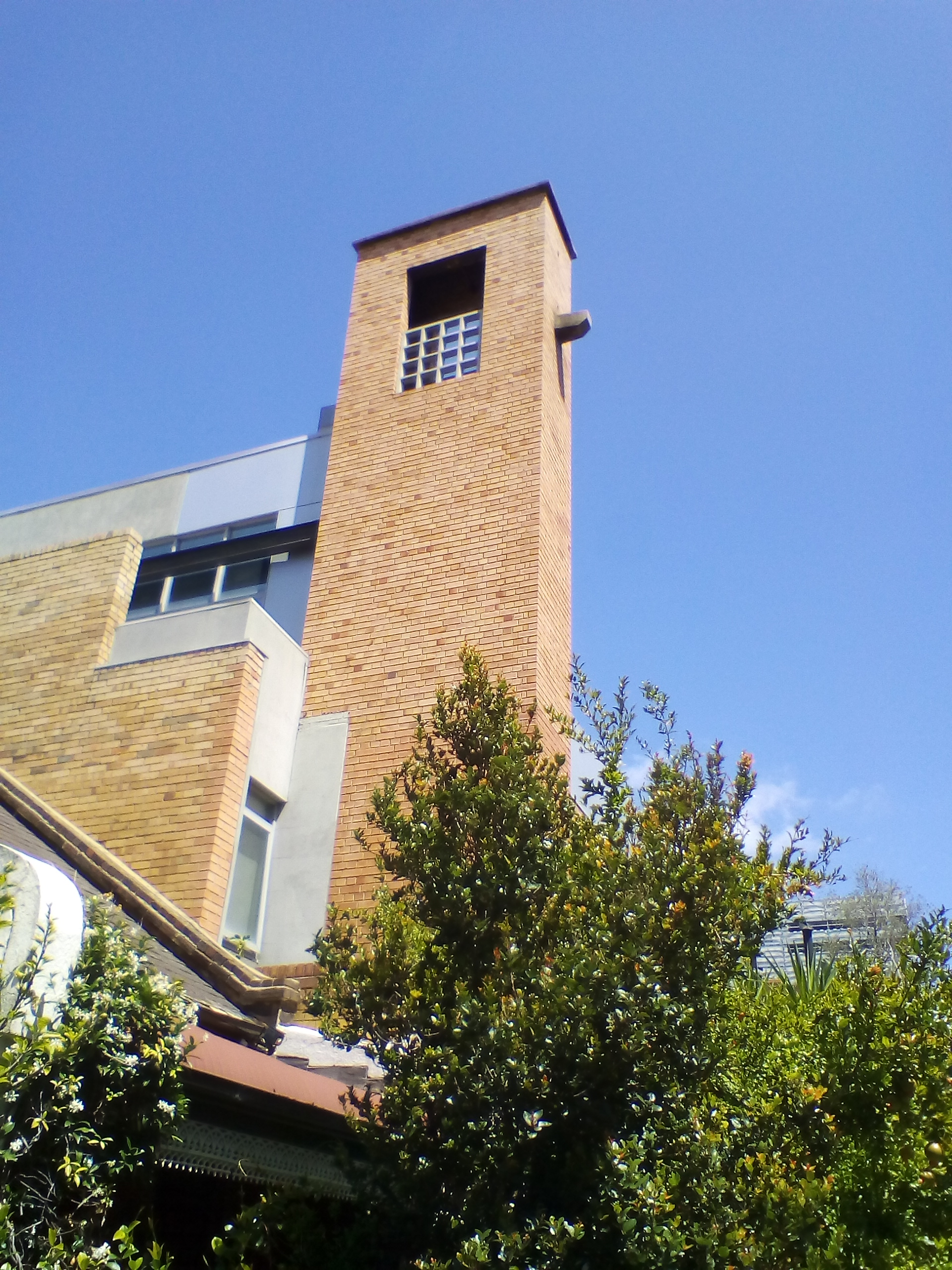
- St George church bell tower

- Location in greater metropolitan Melbourne
- 37°48′24″S 144°58′42″E
- Location: 52-54 Young St, Fitzroy, Melbourne, Victoria
- Country: Australia
- Denomination: Macedonian Orthodox

History
- Status: Church
- Dedication: Saint George
- Consecrated: 1960

Architecture
- Functional status: Closed
- Architect: Wystan Widdows
- Architectural type: Church
- Groundbreaking: 1959

Administration
- Diocese: Macedonian Orthodox Diocese of Australia and New Zealand

St George Macedonian Orthodox Church (Macedonian: Македонска Православна Црква „Св. Ѓорѓи“, Makedonska Pravoslavna Crkva „Sveti Ǵorǵi“) was a Macedonian Orthodox church located in Fitzroy, a suburb of inner Melbourne, Victoria, Australia. Completed in 1959, St George was the first independent Macedonian Orthodox church built within Australia and outside of North Macedonia.

== History ==
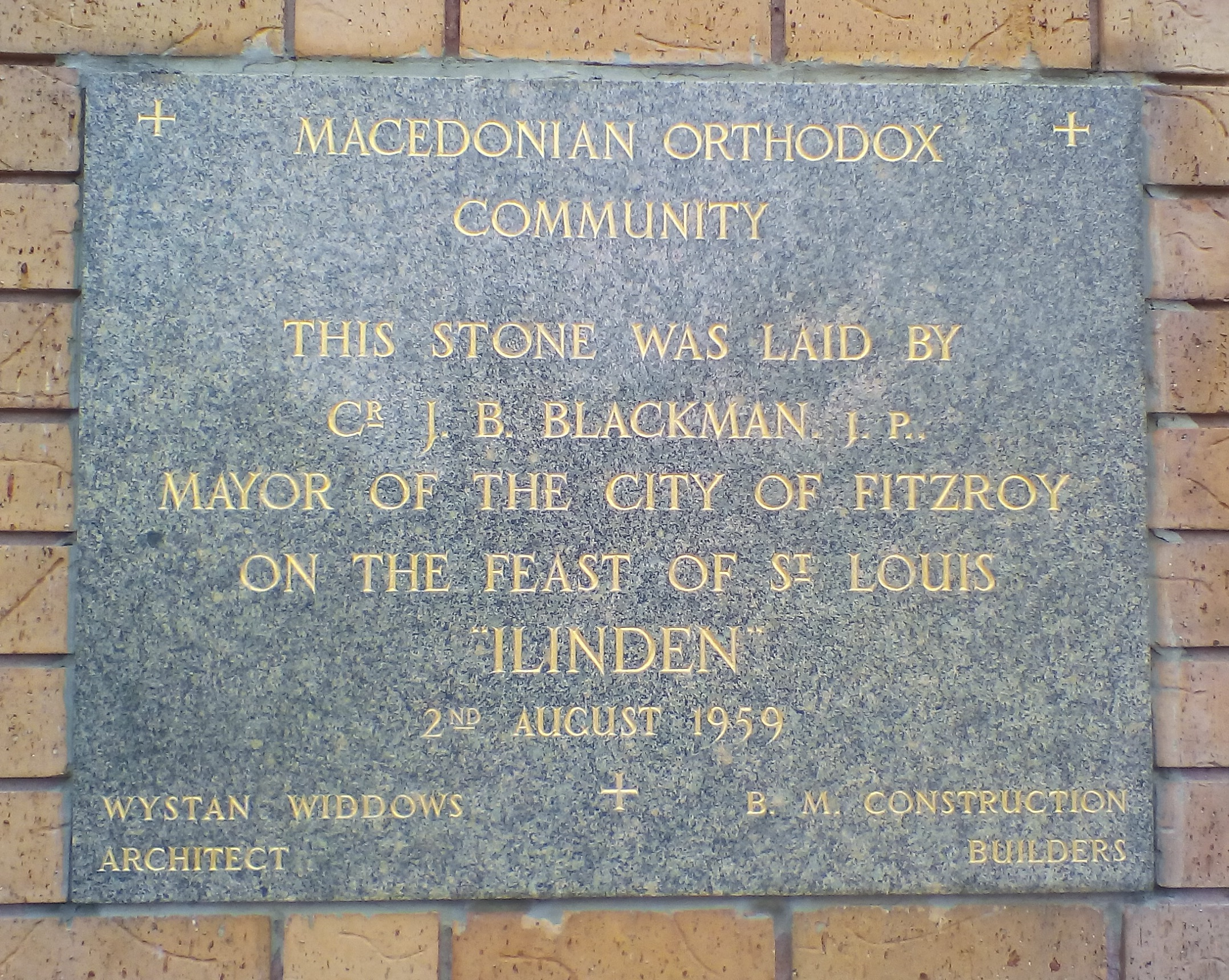
Plaque from St George Church commemorating its founding, now located at the St George & St Mary Church, Epping

In the early period of Macedonian immigration, Macedonians lacked their own churches in Australia and went to different Orthodox churches (Russian, Syrian, Greek, Serbian) or to churches from other Christian denominations (Methodist, Anglican). In Melbourne, Saints Cyril and Methodius was formed in 1950 as a Macedonian church and placed under a Bulgarian bishop. Its priests were from the Bulgarian Orthodox Church in Bulgaria and members of the congregation held concerns about "interference" in their church by consular officials from Greece. At the time, the church itself emerged as a centre for the Macedonian community. Some Macedonian activists were not in favour of the situation as they preferred a Macedonian church that was independent and not attached to Bulgaria. It motivated a small group of Macedonians to seek to form an independent church presence.

From 1955 onward, Macedonian immigrants in Melbourne from the Florina area (in northwestern Greece) led efforts to establish St George as the first Australia-based independent Autocephalous Macedonian Orthodox Church. Notable Macedonians involved in the initiative were Atanas and Done Filipov, Dane Trpkov, Stojan Srbinov, Risto Altin and Vančo Nedelkovski. A Church Committee made up of elected members was established in May 1956 and its first president was Vasil Mojanov. Over a period of two years, funds were raised and a plot of land was purchased on Young Street, in the inner Melbourne suburb of Fitzroy, home to many immigrants from southern Europe.

In Victoria, Vasil Mojanov maintained cordial relations with the local Anglican Church leadership and some politicians, and those efforts assisted with the founding of St George Church. At first, the church was intended to be under the local Anglican Church. In Yugoslavia, the Macedonian Orthodox Church became autonomous in 1959 and the Melbourne Church Committee asked Macedonian church leaders to join and were later accepted as its first parish abroad. In Melbourne, the Fitzroy Municipal Council stated that no Macedonian Orthodox Church organisation existed and withdrew the permit to build a church. The St George Church Committee took the matter to the Australian courts and won their right to construct a church in the Victorian Supreme Court. The church was registered in 1959.

On 2 August 1959, Fitzroy mayor J. B. Blackman laid the church foundation stone which was blessed by Father George Haydar from the Syrian Orthodox Church in Melbourne. On 2 August 1960, the church was officially opened after its consecration by the Bishop Naum of Zletovo-Strumica (Diocese of Macedonia), his deputy Father Nestor Popovski along with Father Ǵorǵi Angelovski. A large number of Macedonians were present at the consecration ceremony till evening. The gathered crowd expressed emotions of joy, especially as they were able to freely state being Macedonian. The first priest of St George was Father Ǵorǵi Angelovski. Annually during Easter celebrations, the Macedonian community would circle the church three times.

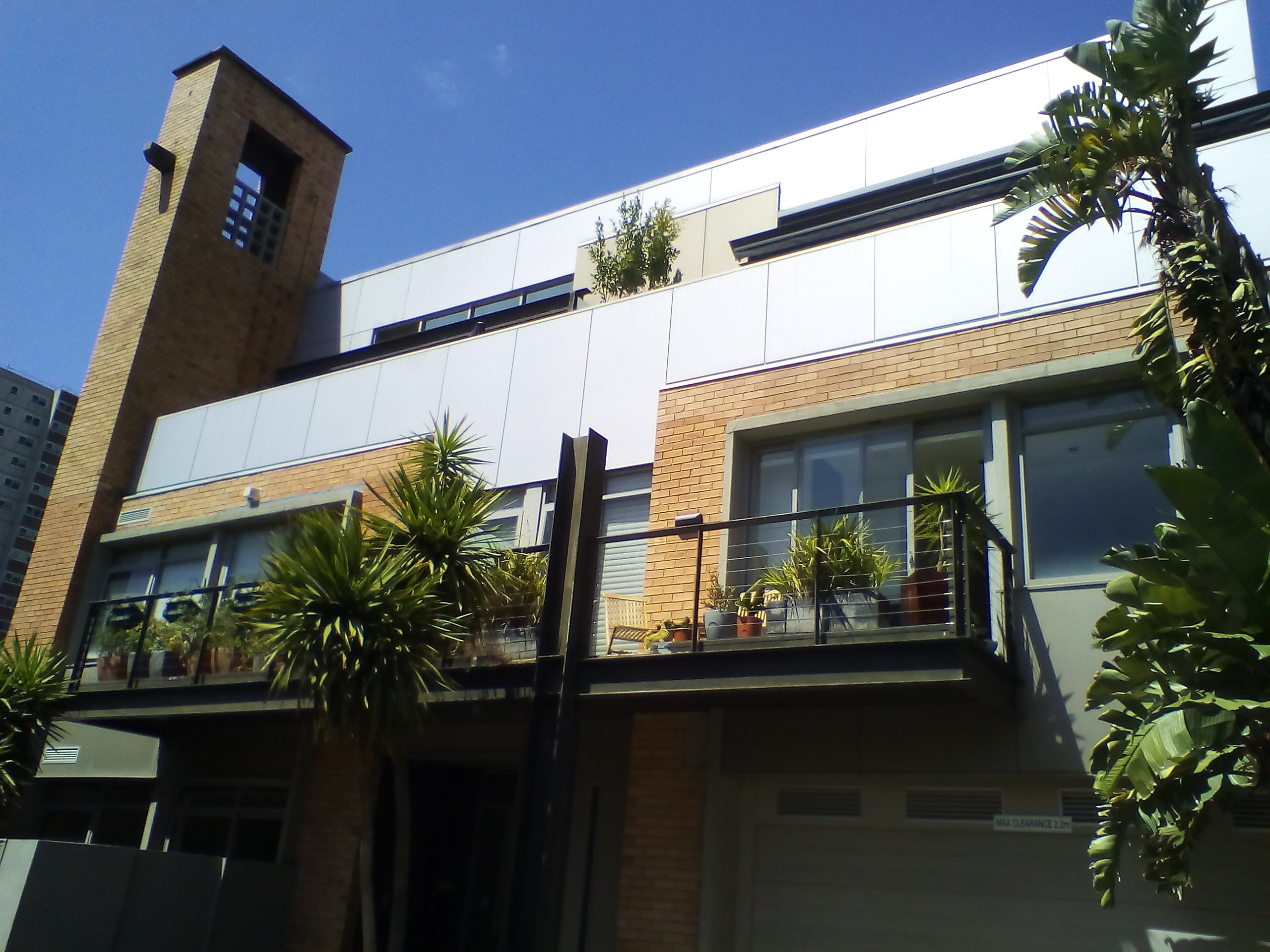
Building redeveloped as apartments. Brickwork and bell tower are original remnants of St George Church

The establishment of St George was a pivotal moment that initiated the unitary religious and social life of the Macedonian Australian community and asserted their existence in the country. Being the first Macedonian church within Australia, there were various reactions to the move. The Australian-based Bulgarian, Serbian and Greek churches engaged in a vigorous and public campaign opposing the Macedonians. Bulgarian, Serbian and Greek newspapers called into question Macedonian existence with terms such as "pseudo-bishops", "pseudo-Macedonian church" and "pseudo-Macedonians".

News of the church reached other Macedonian Australian communities, the Macedonian American and Canadian communities and Yugoslav Macedonia. Two years after St George opened, the Macedonian American community followed the precedent by building their own church which became the second Macedonian church outside Macedonia. The establishment of St George prompted Macedonian communities of Australia to construct their own churches.

At St George Church, the adoption of a democratic constitution by the elected Church Committee governed its actions and decisions which gave it the authority to appoint and dismiss priests without a bishop's approval. Disputes emerged over control of St George with the Macedonian Orthodox Church in Yugoslavia. St George Church did not follow the diocesan constitution which stipulated the influence of the Metropolitan for Australia over Church Committees and to own the titles of church properties. The metropolitan attempted to limit membership of the St George Church Committee to citizens from Yugoslavia during the 1960s - early 1970s. The dispute between the Macedonian Orthodox Church and St George Church continued without a resolution in the mid-1970s. Some other Macedonian Orthodox churches built in Australia after St George also adopted its model of church administration.

In the mid 1990s, the church was subjected to an attempted arson attack.

The church was sold, and large parts of the Macedonian community did not favour the move. The site was redeveloped and is now home to urban residents, with the bell tower being one of the remaining features of the former church.

== See also ==
- Macedonian Australians
