= Irinej Dobrijević =

Serbian Orthodox Bishop

His Grace Irinej Dobrijević
- Bishop
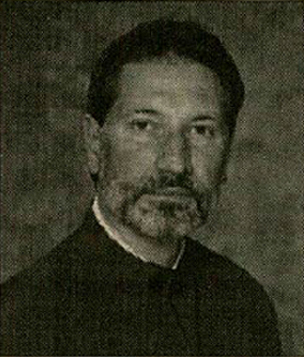
- Bishop Irinej (then a hieromonk) in 2004
- Church: Serbian Orthodox Church
- Diocese: Diocese of Eastern America
- Appointed: May 26, 2016
- Installed: October 1, 2016
- Predecessor: Mitrofan (Kodić)
- Previous post: Diocese of Australia and New Zealand (2006–2016)

Orders
- Ordination: January 18, 1995 by Christopher (Kovacevich)
- Consecration: July 15, 2006 by Amfilohije (Radović)

Personal details
- Born: Mirko Dobrijević; February 6, 1955 (age 71) Cleveland, Ohio, U.S.
- Denomination: Orthodox Christian
- Residence: Washington, D.C. and New Rochelle, New York

Irinej Dobrijević (Serbian Cyrillic: Иринеј Добријевић; born 6 February 1955) has been the Serbian Orthodox Bishop of Eastern America since 2016. Formerly, he was the Serbian Orthodox Bishop of Australia and New Zealand (2011–2016).

== Biography ==
Bishop Irinej was born on February 6, 1955, in Cleveland to father Đuro and mother Milica (née Svilar). He grew up and was educated in his native Cleveland, where he completed twelve grades of general education. From 1973 until 1975, he was educated at the Cleveland Institute of Art. He attended Saint Tikhon's Orthodox Theological Seminary in South Canaan Township, Pennsylvania from 1975 to 1979. In 1980, he began his studies at Saint Vladimir's Orthodox Theological Seminary in Crestwood, New York, graduating in 1982. After completing his studies at the Orthodox Spiritual Academy of St. Tikhon with the academic grade maxima cum laude, and the Academy of St. Vladimir, he received the title of Master of Divinity with special honors for his master's thesis Bishop Nikolaj Velimirović: 1921 Mission in America.

On January 15, 1994, Metropolitan Christopher of Midwestern America ordained him as a deacon in the Holy Resurrection Serbian Orthodox Cathedral in Chicago. He received monastic vows on January 18, 1995 in the Saint Sava Monastery in Libertyville, and on that occasion he received the monastic name Irinej, after the Bishop of Lyon, Saint Irenaeus.

He was one of the key participants in the visit of religious leaders from the USA to Yugoslavia in 1999. He attended the Athens Center in 2000 and 2003, after which he received a diploma in the knowledge of the modern Greek language. He is the holder of the Order of Vuk Karadžić, third degree, which was awarded to him by Svetozar Marović, the president of the state union of Serbia and Montenegro.

He has taught at Loyola University in Chicago, and at the invitation of Serbian Patriarch Pavle at the University of Belgrade Faculty of Theology. For several years, he was one of the editors of the magazine Staze Pravoslavlja, the official publication of the Serbian Orthodox Church in North America. He is a member of the Jasenovac Board and the Permanent Mission Board of the Holy Synod of Bishops and the Committee for Kosovo and Metohija of the Holy Synod of Bishops. He had a notable role as executive director of the Office for Foreign Affairs of the Serbian Orthodox Church in Washington. He was the initiator of connecting the largest Serbian organizations in America.

Until he was elected Bishop of the Diocese of Australia and New Zealand, he held the position of an official of the Holy Synod of Bishops and the head of the Office of the Committee for Kosovo and Metohija of the Holy Synod of Bishops.

=== Bishop ===
Based on the decision of the Holy Council of Bishops on May 26, 2006, he was elected Bishop of the Diocese of Australia and New Zealand. He was promoted to the rank of Archimandrite on June 18, 2006. He was consecrated on July 15, 2006, in the Church of St. Michael the Archangel in Belgrade. The ordination was performed, on behalf of His Holiness Patriarch Pavle of Serbia, by His Eminence Archbishop of Cetinje and Metropolitan of Montenegro and the Littoral Amfilohije, with the concelebration of sixteen bishops. He was installed as Bishop of the Diocese of Australia and New Zealand on October 21, 2006, by His Grace Bishop Hrizostom of Bihać and Petrovac, a member of the Holy Synod of Bishops, in the Cathedral of St. Sava at Elanora Heights in Sydney.

At the parallel session of the Diocesan Council of the Diocese of Australia-New Zealand and the Church-People's Assembly of the Diocese for Australia and New Zealand of the Metropolis of New Gračanica, in September 2010, the unique Constitution of the Metropolis of Australia-New Zealand was adopted, which achieved complete ecclesiastical-administrative unity of the Serbian Orthodox Church in the diaspora. The following year, Bishop Irinej was elected Bishop of the Diocese of Australia and New Zealand.

At the regular May session of the Holy Synod of Bishops, on May 26, 2016, Bishop Irinej was elected as the Bishop of the Eparchy of Eastern America, and the former bishop Mitrofan (Kodić) was elected as the Bishop of the vacant Canadian Diocese. Protosyncellus Siluan (Mrakić) was elected as the new Bishop of the Diocese of Australia and New Zealand.

Serbian Orthodox Church titles
Vacant Title last held by Luka Kovačević	Bishop of Australia and New Zealand; 2006 – 2016	Succeeded by Siluan Mrakić
Preceded by Mitrofan Kodić	Bishop of Eastern America; 2016 – present	Incumbent
