= St. George & St. Mary Mother of God Macedonian Orthodox Church, Epping =

St. George & St. Mary Mother of God Macedonian Orthodox Church
- Македонска Православна Црква „Св. Ѓорѓи и Пресвета Богородица“ Makedonska Pravoslavna Crkva „Sv. Ǵorǵi i Presveta Bogorodica“
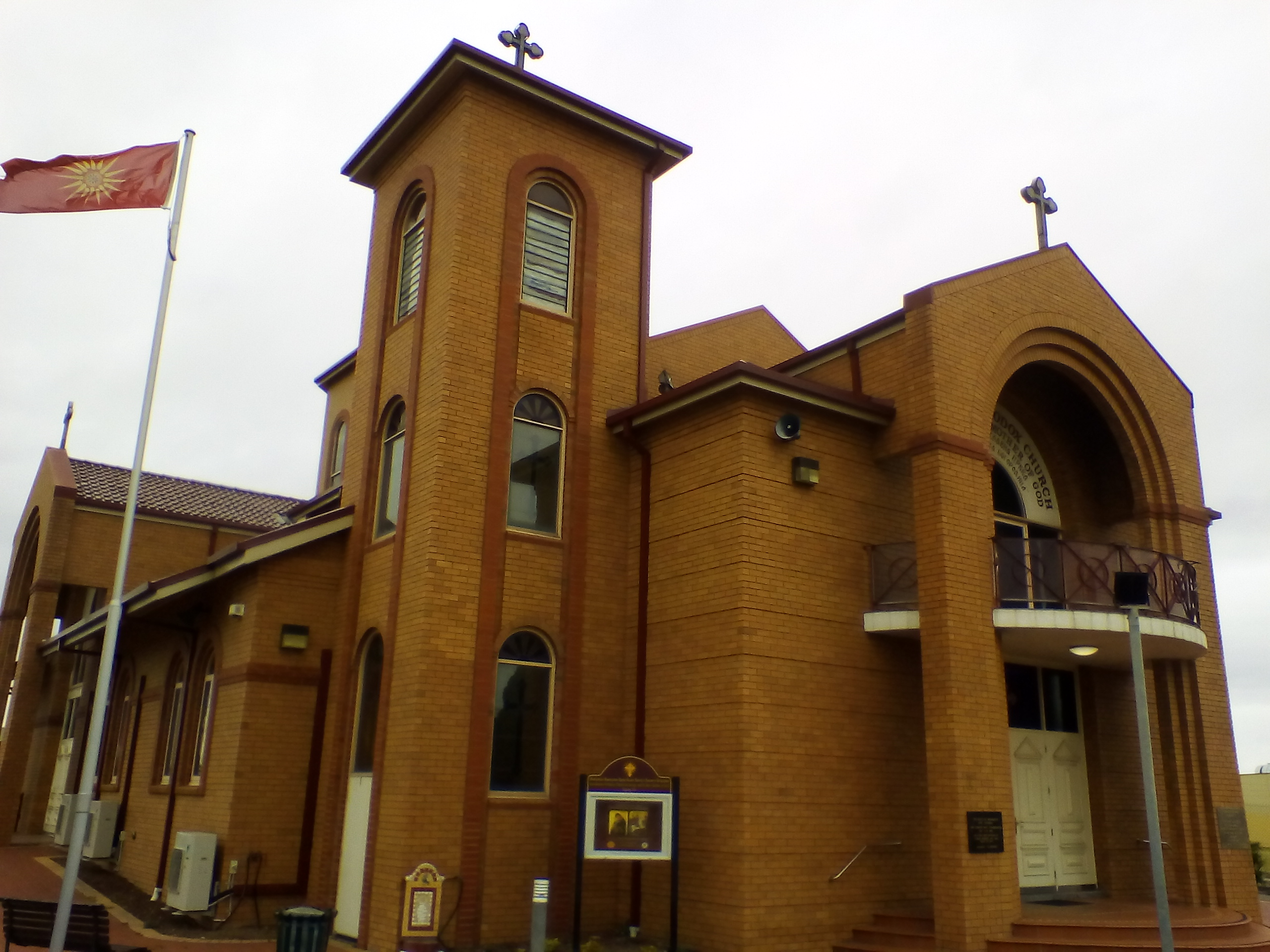

- Location in greater metropolitan Melbourne
- 37°39′27″S 145°01′15″E
- Location: 512 High St, Epping 3076, Melbourne, Victoria
- Country: Australia
- Denomination: Macedonian Orthodox
- Website: St. George & St. Mary Mother of God Church

History
- Status: Church
- Founded: c. 1995
- Dedication: St. George, St. Mary
- Consecrated: 1995

Architecture
- Functional status: Active
- Architect: G. Petridis
- Architectural type: Church

Administration
- Diocese: Macedonian Orthodox Diocese of Australia - Sydney

Clergy
- Priest: Reverend Father Kliment Stankovski

St. George & St. Mary Mother of God Macedonian Orthodox Church (Macedonian: Македонска Православна Црква „Св. Ѓорѓи и Пресвета Богородица“, Makedonska Pravoslavna Crkva „Sv. Ǵorǵi i Presveta Bogorodica“) is the Macedonian Orthodox church in Epping, a suburb of northern Melbourne, Victoria, Australia.

Constructed in 1995, the church is next to the Macedonian Community Centre. services are conducted in Macedonian and, starting in the late 2010s, in English as well.

== Gallery ==
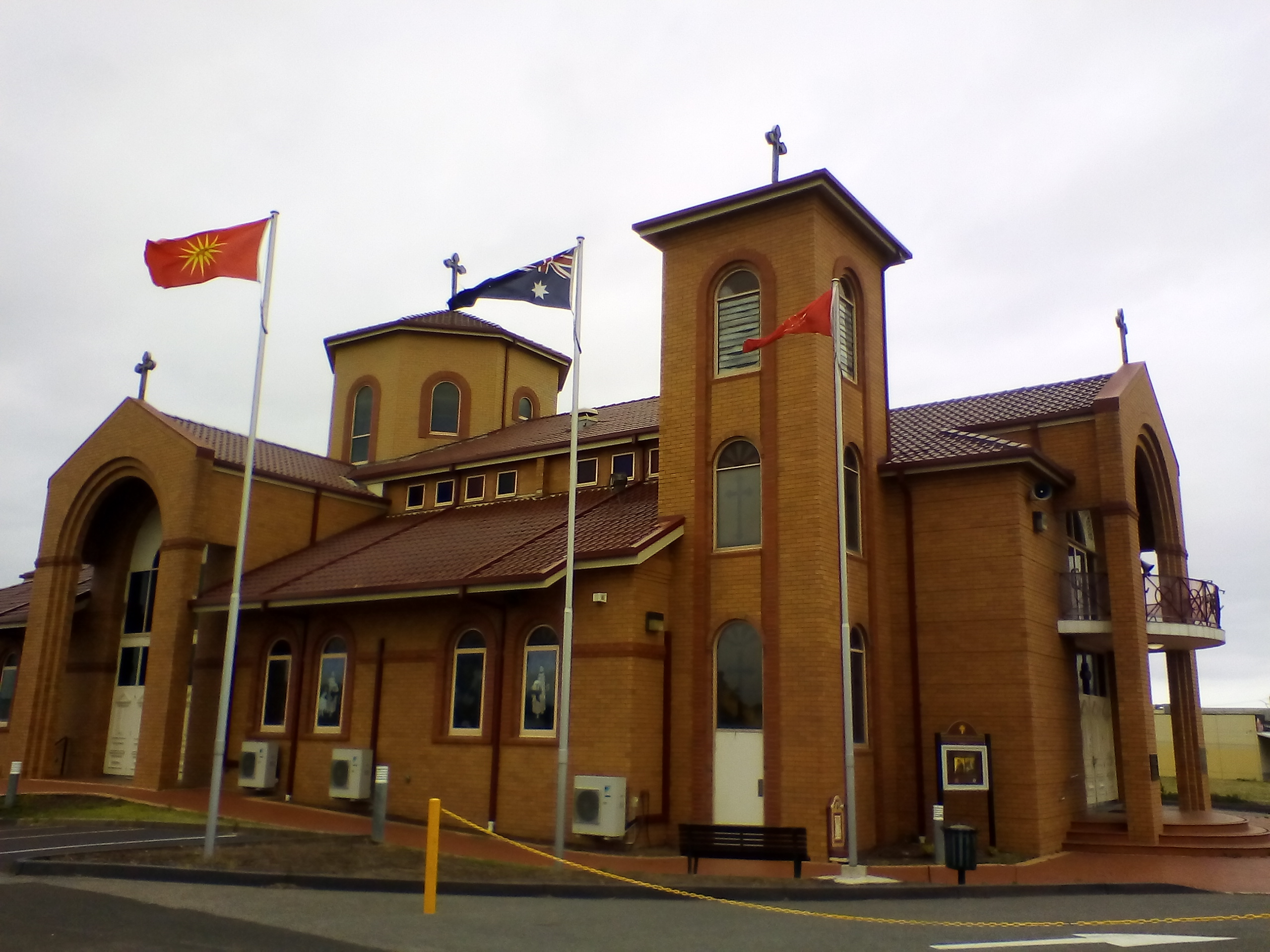
Side view of church

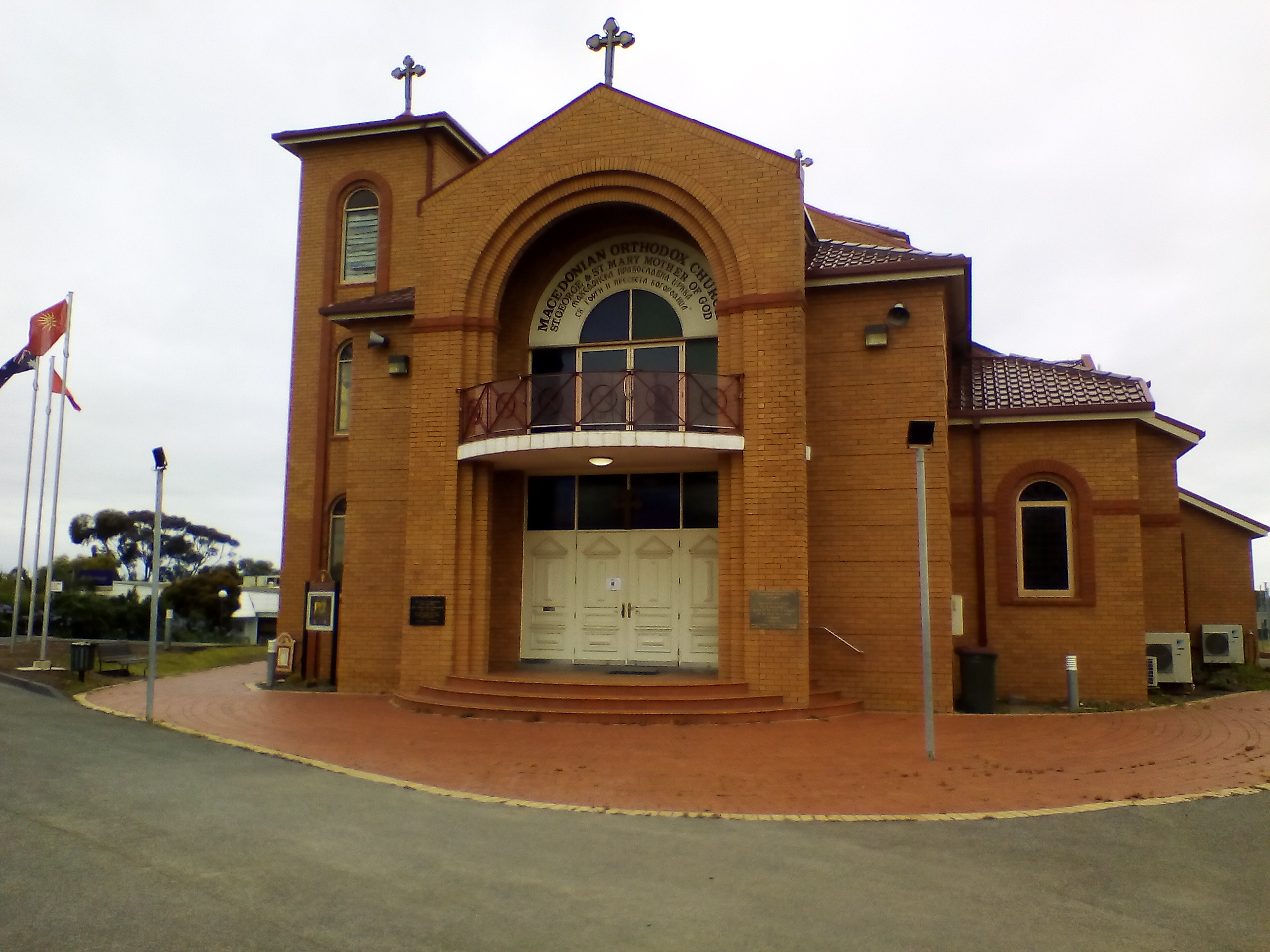
Front view of church

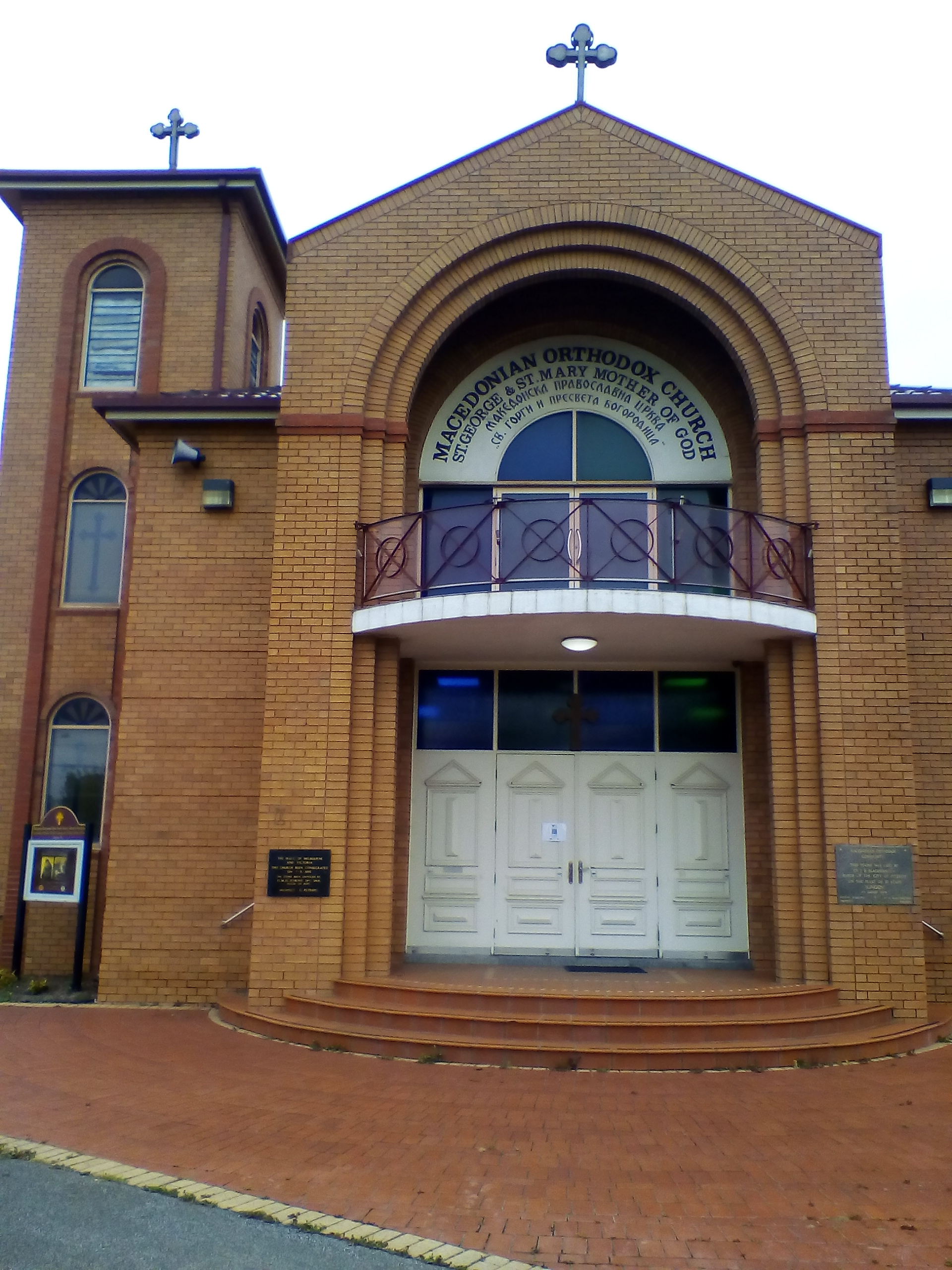
Church entrance

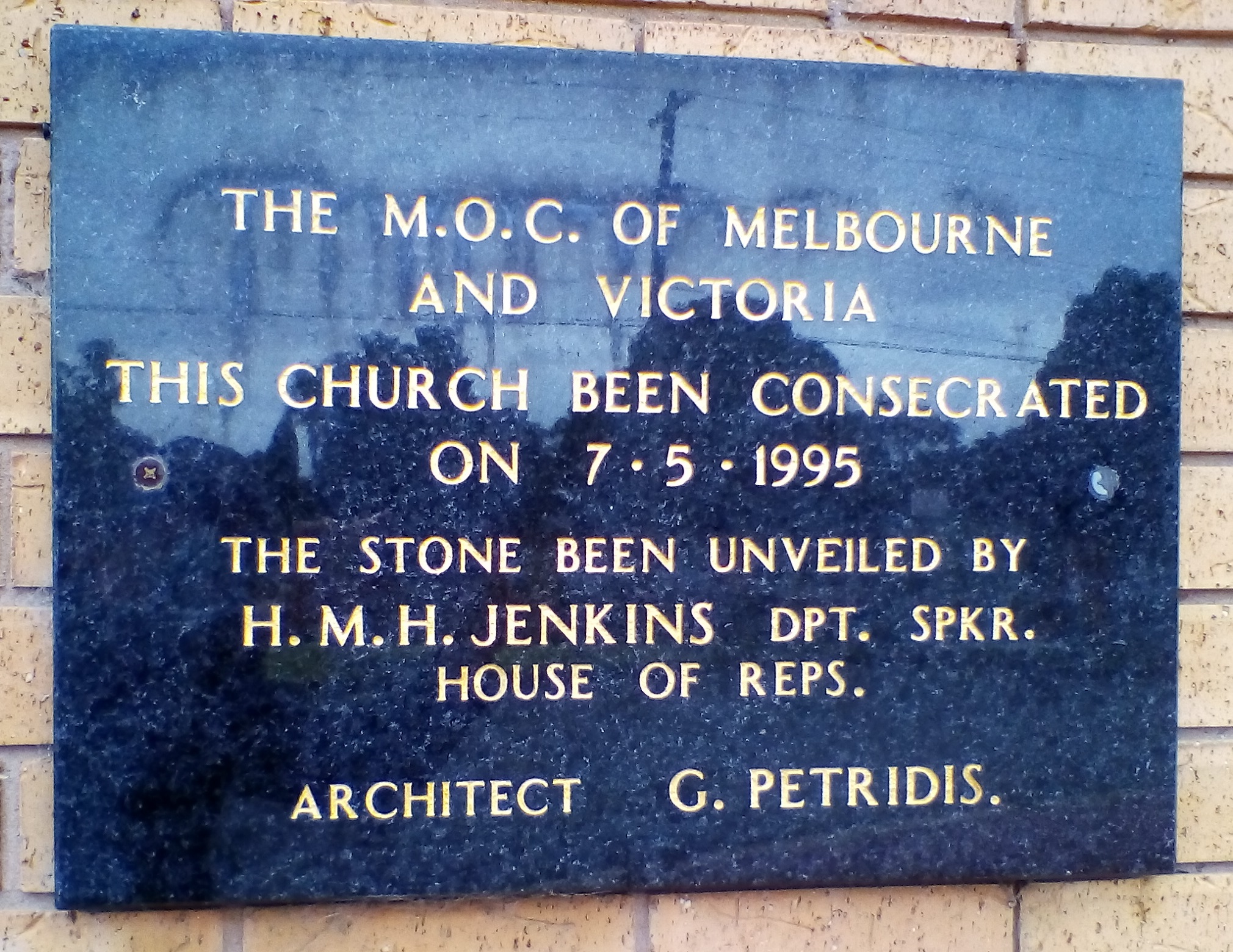
Plaque commemorating Church founding

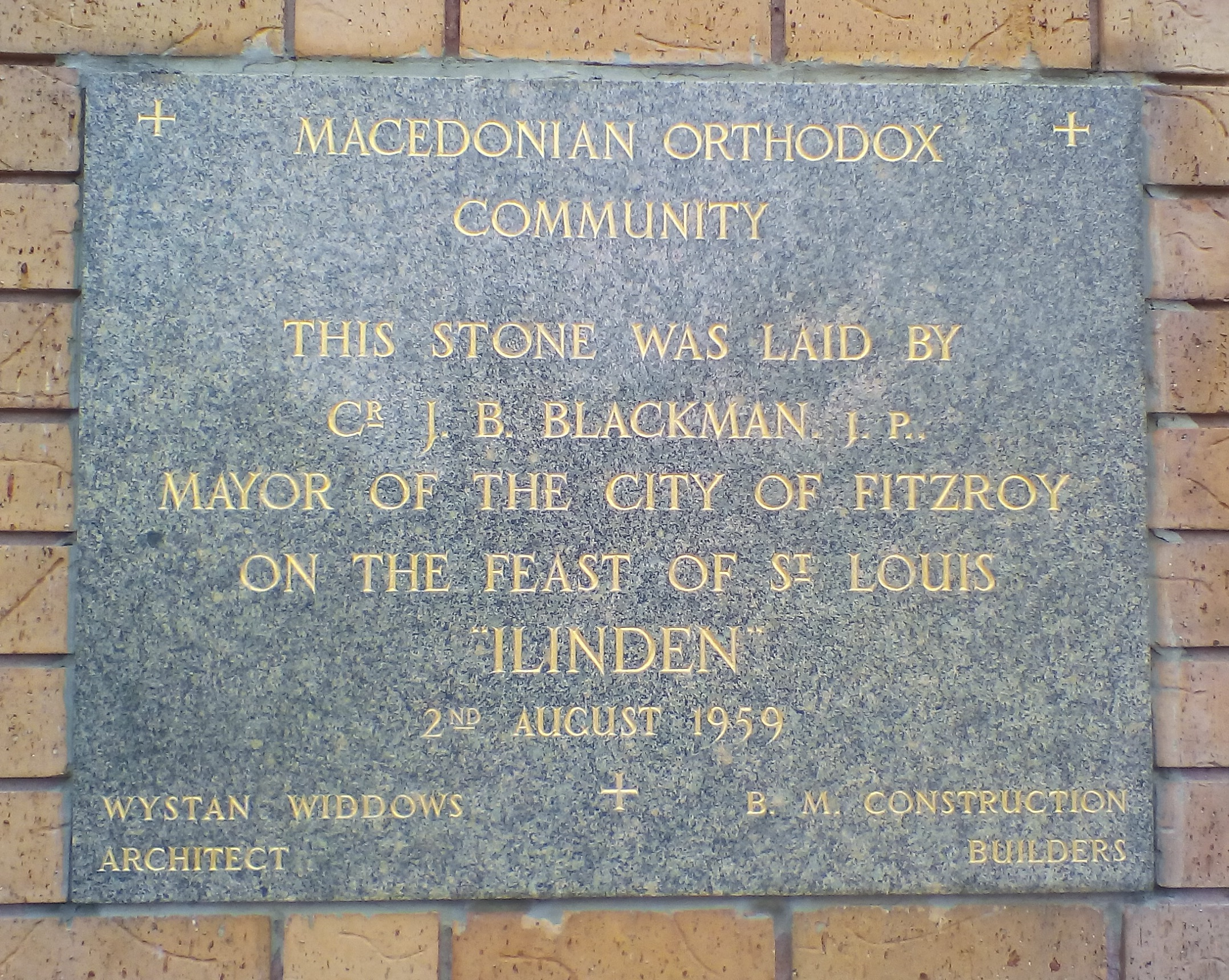
Plaque from first former Macedonian Church of St. George in Fitzroy commemorating its founding

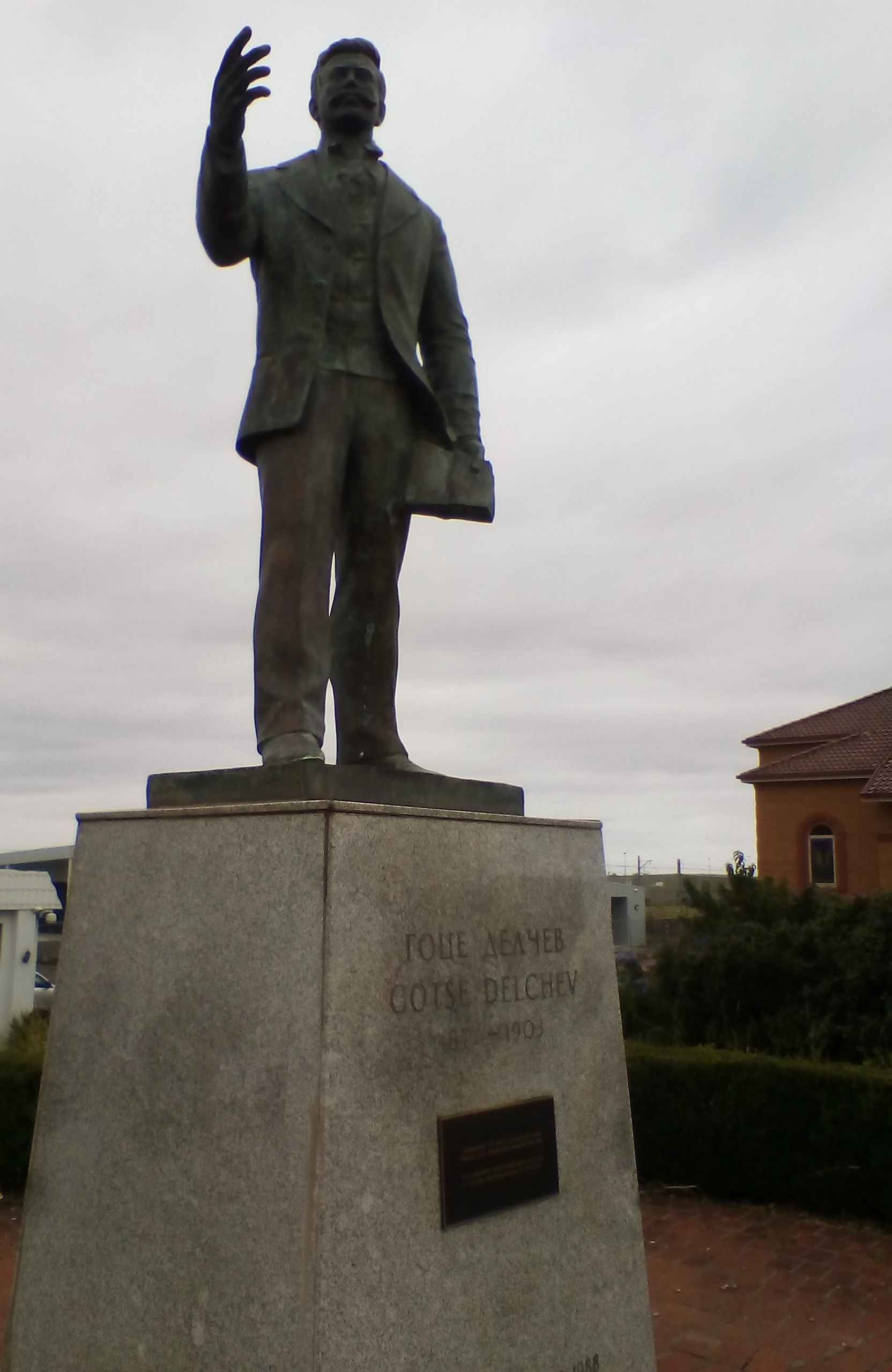
Goce Delčev statue

== See also ==
- Macedonian Australians
