= Siluan Mrakić =

Metropolitan of Australia and New Zealand

His Eminence Siluan
- Archbishop of Sydney and Wellington, Metropolitan of Australia and New Zealand
- Church: Serbian Orthodox Church
- Diocese: Metropolitanate of Australia and New Zealand
- Elected: 26 May 2016
- Installed: 7 August 2016
- Predecessor: Irinej (Dobrijević)

Orders
- Ordination: 18 December 2010 by Milutin (Knežević)
- Consecration: 7 August 2016 by Serbian Patriarch Irinej
- Rank: Bishop

Personal details
- Born: Aleksandar Mrakić; 17 September 1979 (age 47) Sydney, Australia
- Denomination: Orthodox Christian
- Residence: Sydney, Australia
- Education: University of Belgrade

Siluan Mrakić (Serbian Cyrillic: Силуан Мракић; born 17 September 1979) is a Serbian Orthodox bishop, serving as the bishop of Australia and New Zealand since August 2016.

== Early life and education ==
Aleksandar Mrakić was born on 17 September 1979, in Sydney, Australia, to Veljko and Janja Mrakić (née Vukanović). The same year, he was baptised at Saint Nicholas Serbian Orthodox Church in Blacktown, Sydney. His family hails from Herzegovina, from the Zavala hamlet of Budim Do, Trebinje district.

He completed elementary school at Parramatta Primary School, followed by secondary school studies at Arthur Phillip High School. Aleksandar later enrolled in the Theological Seminary of St. Peter of Cetinje in 1995. After graduating from the seminary in 2003, he enrolled in the University of Belgrade Faculty of Orthodox Theology, later graduating in 2005. After graduating, he returned to Australia, where he became a novice at the Saint Sava Novi Kalenić Monastery. In that capacity, in 2006, he travelled to the newly-established Diocese of Valjevo. Shortly afterwards, he continued his theological training in Russia, enrolling in the Moscow Theological Academy in the Trinity Lavra of St. Sergius in Sergiyev Posad.

After graduating from the Moscow Theological Academy in 2009, he continued scientific education there, writing a candidate's dissertation on the topic of the Anthropology of the Venerable Justin Popović. He successfully defended his dissertation at the end of 2010, receiving the highest theological-scientific title of the Russian Orthodox Church, a Candidate of Theology. On 18 December 2010, the feast of Saint Sabbas the Sanctified, Aleksandar was tonsured a monk by Bishop Milutin (Knežević) of Valjevo in the Pustinja monastery. The following day, in the presence of the relics of Saint Nikolaj of Serbia, he was ordained a hierodeacon in Lelić. In 2012, he enrolled in Master's studies at the Greek Theological Faculty of St. Andrew the First-Called, in his hometown of Sydney. After completing his studies, he was ordained a hieromonk, receiving the office of protosyncellus in the same year.

== Episcopal ministry ==
At the end of 2015, Bishop Milutin appointed Father Siluan as the Dean of the First Deanery of Valjevo. On 26 May 2016, at a regular session of the Holy Assembly of Bishops, Siluan was elected Bishop of the Metropolitanate of Australia and New Zealand. His predecessor, Irinej (Dobrijević) was subsequently elected as Bishop of Eastern America.

Siluan was ordained a bishop in the St. Michael's Patriarchal Cathedral in Belgrade on 7 August 2016, with the reading of his episcopal nomination performed the day prior.

On 22 October 2016, Bishop Siluan was enthroned as Bishop of Australia and New Zealand at St. George Cathedral in Cabramatta, New South Wales, by Bishop Longin of Gračanica.

On 7 September 2019, a historic celebration was held at the Chapel of St. Sava College in Varroville, New South Wales, commemorating the 800-year anniversary of the autocephaly of the Serbian Orthodox Church, alongside the 70-year anniversary of the Serbian Orthodox Metropolitanate of Australia and New Zealand. Bishop Siluan led the liturgical celebrations, concelebrating with Bishop Iakovos of Miletoupolis; Metropolitan Basilios of Australia, New Zealand and the Philippines; Bishop Longin of Gračanica; Archimandrite Metodije of Hilandar, and other clergy of the Serbian Metropolitanate of Australia and New Zealand.

In May 2024, by the decision of the Holy Synod of the Serbian Orthodox Church, Bishop Siluan was elevated to the rank of Metropolitan. He was granted the official title of "Archbishop of Sydney and Wellington and Metropolitan of Australia and New Zealand."

Metropolitan Siluan (centre) carrying relics in the Consecration of a Church, 2026

In October 2026, Metropolitan Siluan led the preparations for a historical pastoral visit of Patriarch Porfirije to Australia. The visit contained several festal liturgical celebrations and civil commemorations in Melbourne, Canberra, and Sydney. Among the several events planned, the Patriarch led the consecration of a church in Keysborough, Victoria, and the consecration of the Chapel of St. Sava College in Varroville, NSW. The Patriarchal visit was accompanied by several visiting hierarchs and clergy, as well as clergy from the Metropolitanate of Australia and New Zealand.

Serbian Orthodox Church titles
Preceded by Irinej (Dobrijević)	Bishop of Australia and New Zealand; 2016 – present	Succeeded by Incumbent
