= Nives Botica Redmayne =

New Zealand accountancy professor

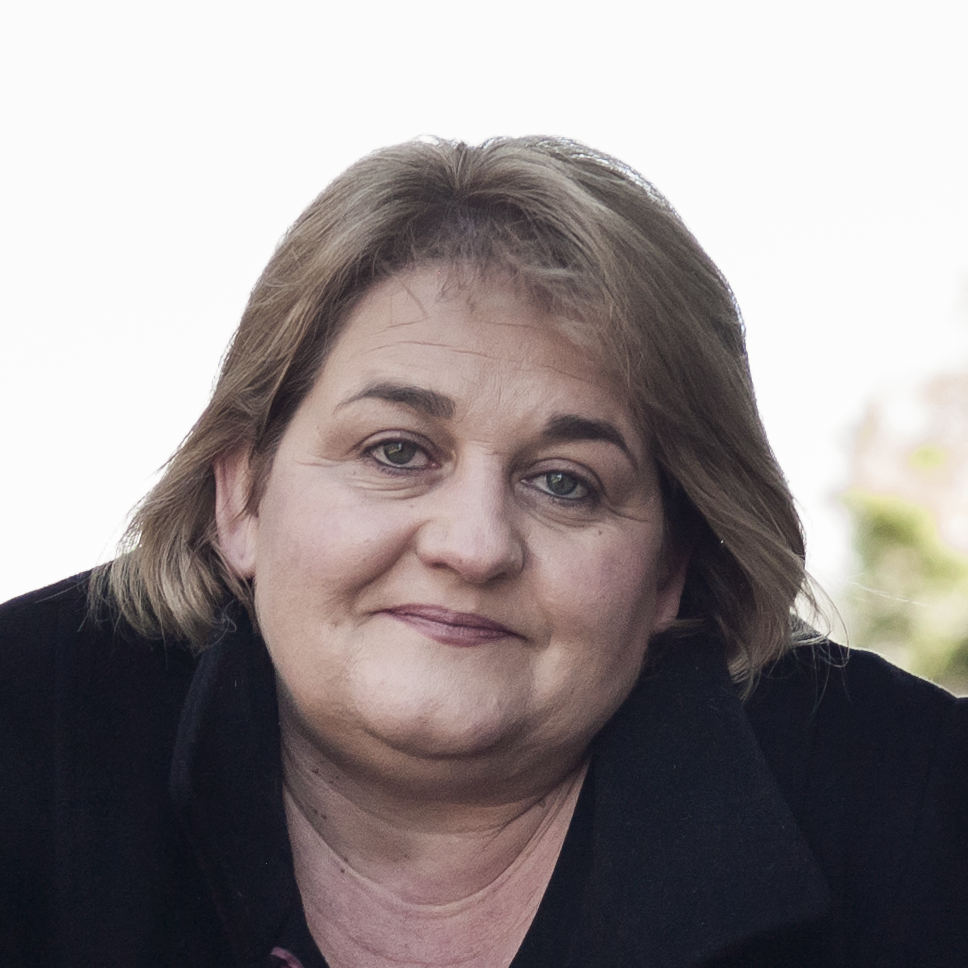
- Botica Redmayne in 2016

Academic background
- Education: Massey University, University of Zagreb
- Thesis: The production of audit services in the New Zealand public sector : an investigation into the effects of political risk and corporate governance on audit effort (2004)
- Doctoral advisor: Steven F. Cahan, Michael E. Bradbury

Nives Botica Redmayne is a New Zealand academic, and is a full professor at Massey University, specialising in audit services production. Botica Redmayne teaches advanced auditing and advanced financial reporting.

== Academic career ==
Botica Redmayne is a third-generation accountant and wanted to be an auditor since she was a child. However her first degree, from the University of Zagreb, was in economics and finance, leading her to describe her path into accountancy as "non-traditional". Botica Redmayne completed a PhD titled The production of audit services in the New Zealand public sector: an investigation into the effects of political risk and corporate governance on audit effort at Massey University in 2004. Botica Redmayne then joined the faculty, rising to full professor in 2024.

Botica Redmayne sits on the New Zealand Financial Markets Authority Audit Oversight Committee, which develops standards for New Zealand accountants and auditors.

In 2021, Botica Redmayne was appointed as the first trans-Tasman president of Chartered Accountants Australia and New Zealand. She was also the first academic appointed to the role, which is normally reserved for practising accountants. During her term she focused on sustainability and education initiatives. Botica Redmayne previously served as the New Zealand Vice President of CAANZ in 2019 and 2020.

Botica Redmayne's research focuses on International Financial Reporting Standards (IFRS) and International Public Sector Accounting Standards (IPSAS) in public sector reporting. She examines how the introduction of these auditing and accounting standards affects the quality and cost of reporting and auditing, particularly with respect to the not-for-profit sector.

== Selected works ==
- Botica, Nives; Michael E. Bradbury; Steven F. Cahan (2011). "The Association between Audit Committees and Audit Fees in the Public Sector: The Association between Audit Committees and Audit Fees in the Public Sector". International Journal of Auditing. 15 (3): 301–315. doi:10.1111/j.1099-1123.2011.00436.x. Wikidata Q124074688.
- Kathryn Trewavas; Botica, Nives; Fawzi Laswad (2012). "The Impact of IFRS Adoption on Public Sector Financial Statements". Australian Accounting Review. 22 (1): 86–102. doi:10.1111/j.1835-2561.2011.00160.x. Wikidata Q124074687.
- Botica, Nives; Fawzi Laswad (2013). "An Assessment of the Impact of IFRS Adoption on Public Sector Audit Fees and Audit Effort – Some Evidence of the Transition Costs on Changes in Reporting Regimes". Australian Accounting Review. 23 (1): 88–99. doi:10.1111/j.1835-2561.2012.00166.x. Wikidata Q124074686.
- Botica, Nives; Michael E. Bradbury; Steven F. Cahan (2010). "The effect of political visibility on audit effort and audit pricing". Accounting and Finance. 50 (4): 921–939. doi:10.1111/j.1467-629x.2010.00350.x. Wikidata Q124074685.
- Dimu Ehalaiye; Botica, Nives; Fawzi Laswad (2017). "Financial determinants of local government debt in New Zealand". Pacific Accounting Review. 29 (4): 512–533. doi:10.1108/par-11-2016-0104. Wikidata Q124074588.
- David Hay; Stewart, Jenny D.; Botica, Nives (2017). "The Role of Auditing in Corporate Governance in Australia and New Zealand: A Research Synthesis". Australian Accounting Review. 27 (4): 457–479. doi:10.1111/auar.12190. Wikidata Q124074592.
- Fawzi Laswad; Botica, Nives (2015). "IPSAS or IFRS as the Framework for Public Sector Financial Reporting? New Zealand Preparers' Perspectives". Australian Accounting Review. 25 (2): 175–184. doi:10.1111/auar.12052. Wikidata Q124074482.
- Elizabeth Carson; Botica, Nives; Lin Liao (2014). "Audit Market Structure and Competition in Australia". Australian Accounting Review. 24 (4): 298–312. doi:10.1111/auar.12041. Wikidata Q124074477.
