= Serbian Australians =

Ethnic group

Аустралијски Срби Australijski Srbi
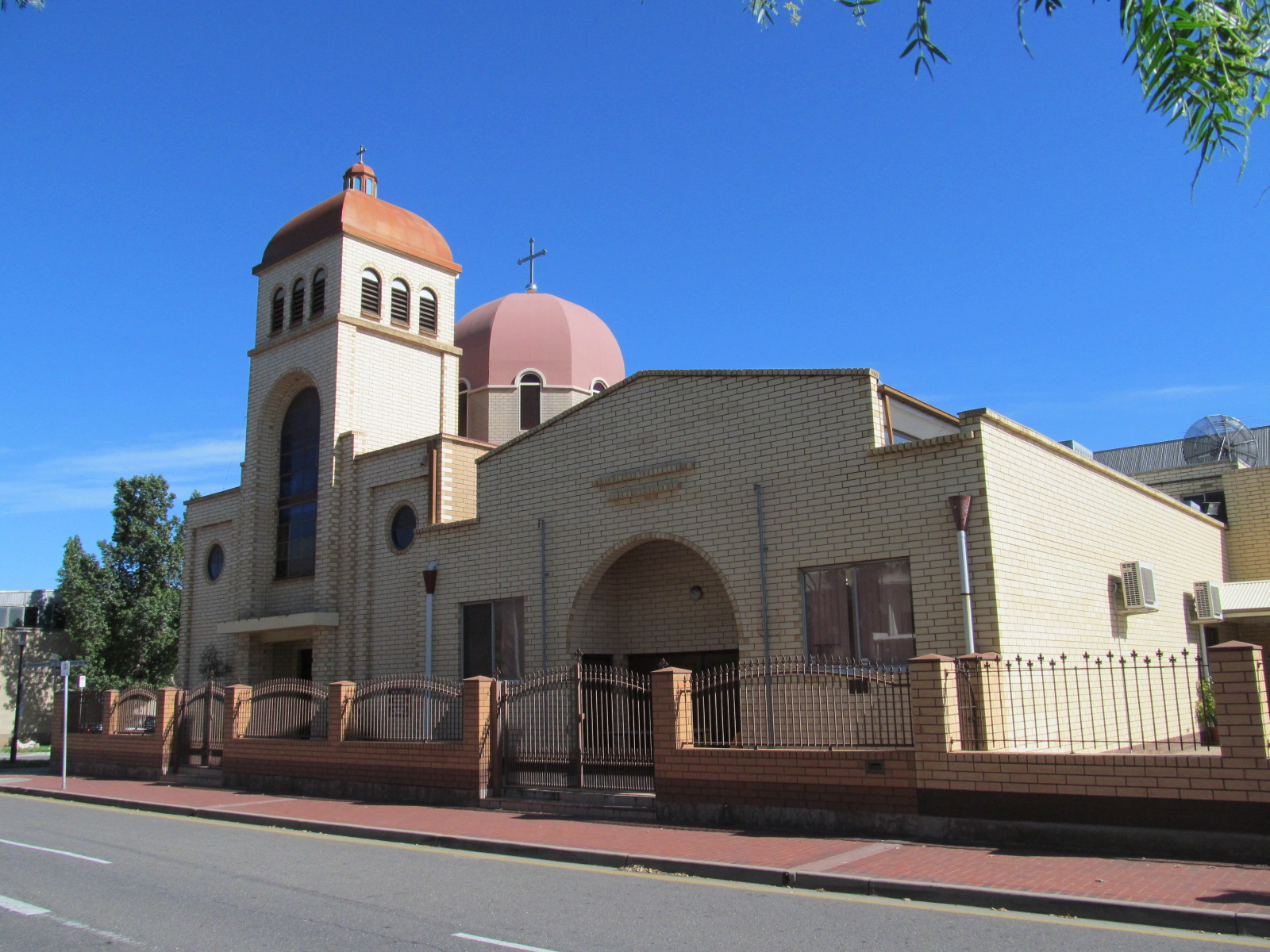
- The Saint Sava Serbian Orthodox Church in Adelaide

Total population
- 94,997 (2021)

Regions with significant populations
- New South Wales, Victoria, Western Australia

Languages
- Australian English and Serbian

Religion
- Predominately Eastern Orthodoxy (Serbian Orthodox Church), minority Protestantism and Catholicism

Related ethnic groups
- Serbian New Zealanders, Montenegrin Australians, Croatian Australians, Bosnian Australians, Macedonian Australians

Serbian Australians or Australian Serbs (Note: The community is commonly known in English as Serbian Australians, and scarcer as Serb Australians. In Serbian, the community is known as Australian Serbs (Aустралијски Срби, Australijski Srbi), and scarcer as Serbs in Australia (Срби у Аустралији, Srbi u Australiji).) are Australians of ethnic Serb ancestry. In 2021, there were 94,997 Serbian Australians, representing one of the largest groups within the global Serb diaspora.

== History ==
During the time of Federation a very small number of ethnic Serbs inhabited Australia. Despite a lack of accurate data, it is assumed that ethnic Serbs deriving from Lika, Dalmatia, and Montenegro did reside in largely mining communities throughout the Commonwealth, though exact numbers are unsubstantiated. The first significant, albeit small wave of Serb immigrants, comprising mostly former POWs, and displaced persons fleeing war and genocide began arriving in Australia as post-war immigrants. This initial wave also included members of the royalist Chetnik movement fleeing political persecution by the Communist regime of Josip Broz Tito.

The easing of emigration restrictions by Yugoslavia generated a second, larger wave of predominantly economic migration throughout the 1960s and 1970s. An agreement between Australia and Yugoslavia facilitated the recruitment of largely unskilled and semi-skilled immigrants, from predominantly rural backgrounds to work in Australia's manufacturing and construction industries. The developing political and economic issues in Yugoslavia during the 1980s, alongside its disintegration, ensuing wars, economic sanctions, and economic crisis of the 1990s, resulted in the largest Serbian migration to Australia.

In recent years, some Serbian Australians have joined the "Serbian Chetniks Australia" organisation. This organization promoting the concept of Chetnik forces fighting against the Nazi forces in Yugoslavia during the World War II has participated in Anzac Day marches in Melbourne and Sydney which drew criticism from the Croatian Australian and Bosnian Australian communities.

== Demographics ==
Map of states and territories by Serbian Australian population, 2021 census. >30,000 10,000 to 30,000 5,000 to 10,000 1,000 to 5,000 <1,000

According to data from the 2021 census, 94,997 people stated that they had Serb ancestry (whether alone or in combination with another ancestry), out of which 25,454 were Serbia-born. Serbian Australians comprise 0.37% of total Australian population.

The Serbian Australian community is heavily concentrated (about 70% of the total) in New South Wales and Victoria, with major hubs in Sydney's south-eastern suburbs and Melbourne's western and south-eastern suburbs.

The Australian Bureau of Statistics allows the provision of two ancestries in a multi-response question for foreign-born residents. In the 2016 census, 67% of Serbian Australians declared full Serb ancestry, 11.8% of individuals identifying as Serb in the first response comprised 11.8%, whilst 21.1% declared Serb heritage in the second response.

Serbian Australians predominantly (about 60%) belong to the Eastern Orthodoxy with the Serbian Orthodox Church (through its Serbian Orthodox Eparchy of Australia and New Zealand) as the traditional church. Some 13.3% adhere to Protestantism, 7% to the Catholicism, while the rest are mainly irreligious.

Language retention is high: only 15.6% speak English exclusively at home, while 68.5% are proficient in English alongside another language (likely Serbian, though specifics are not available).

Education levels are solid, with 21.6% holding a bachelor's degree or higher and 13.8% at Certificate III level.

State/Territory		Population (2021)
Flag of New South Wales	New South Wales	36,056
Flag of Victoria (state)	Victoria	30,133
Flag of Queensland	Queensland	10,121
Flag of Western Australia	Western Australia	8,563
Flag of South Australia	South Australia	7,329
Flag of Australian Capital Territory	Australian Capital Territory	2,191
Flag of Tasmania	Tasmania	469
Flag of Northern Territory	Northern Territory	142

City	Population (2021)
Sydney	25,161
Melbourne	20,789
Brisbane	6,495
Perth	3,977
Adelaide	2,786
Canberra	1,180

== Notable people ==
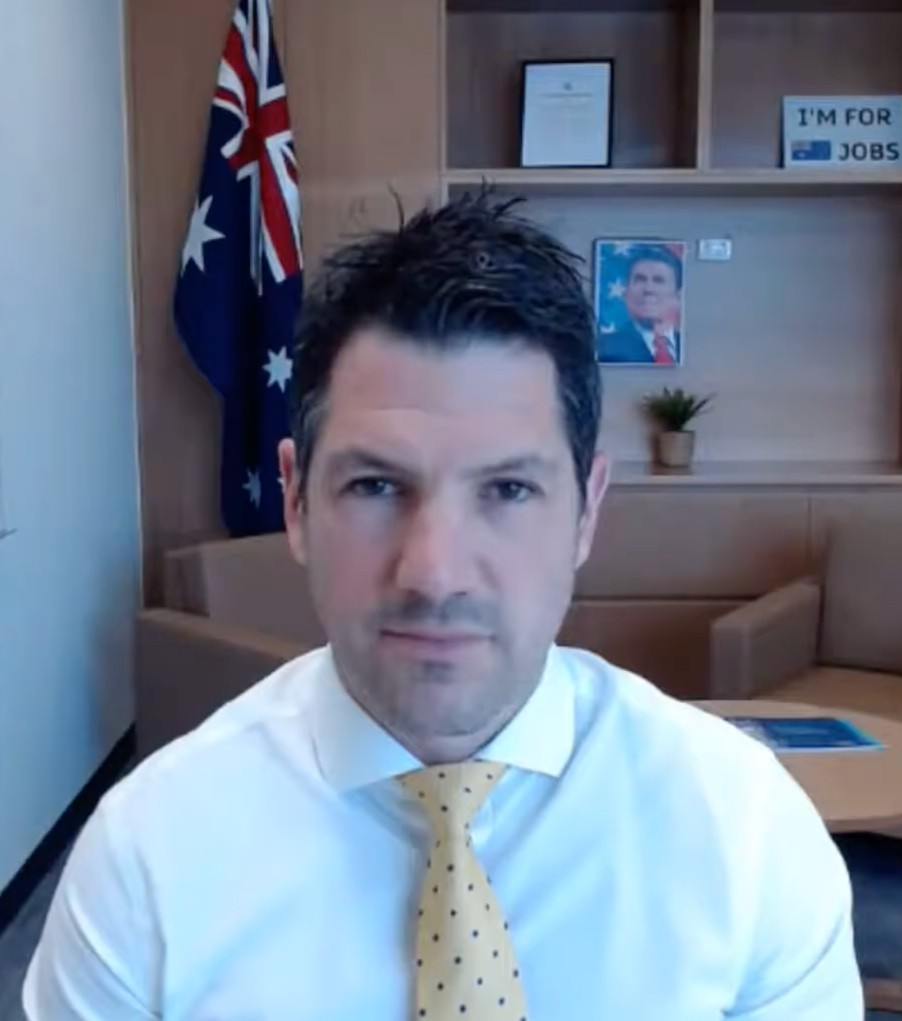
Alex Antic

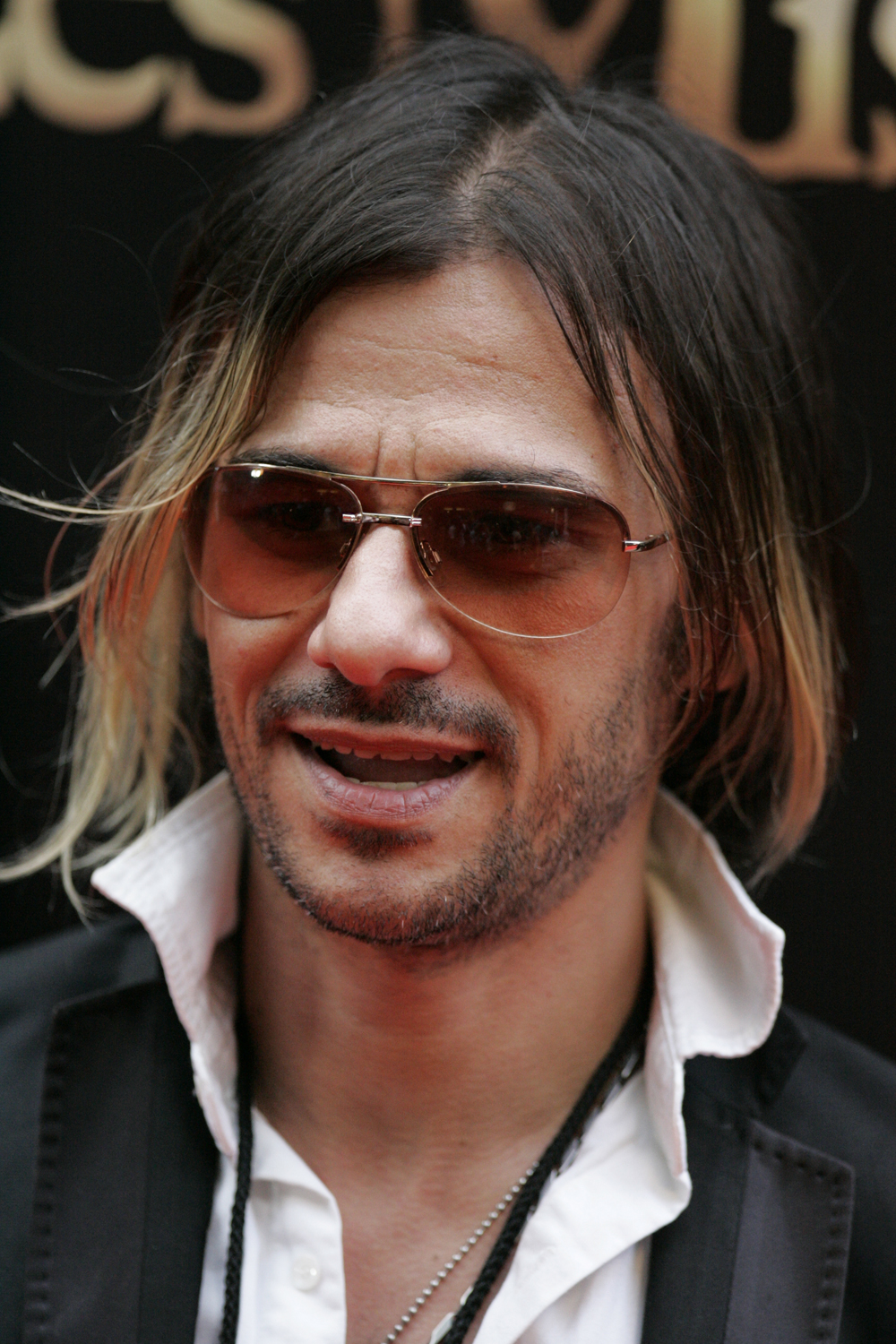
Altiyan Childs

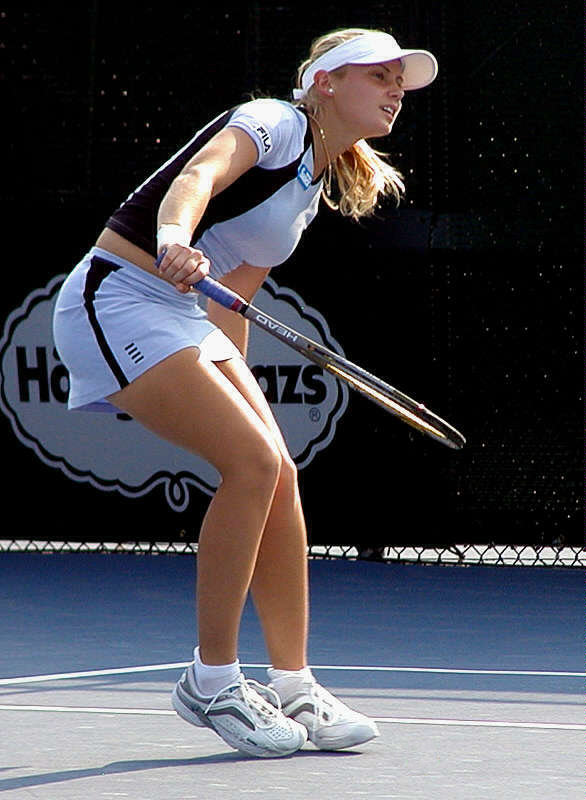
Jelena Dokić

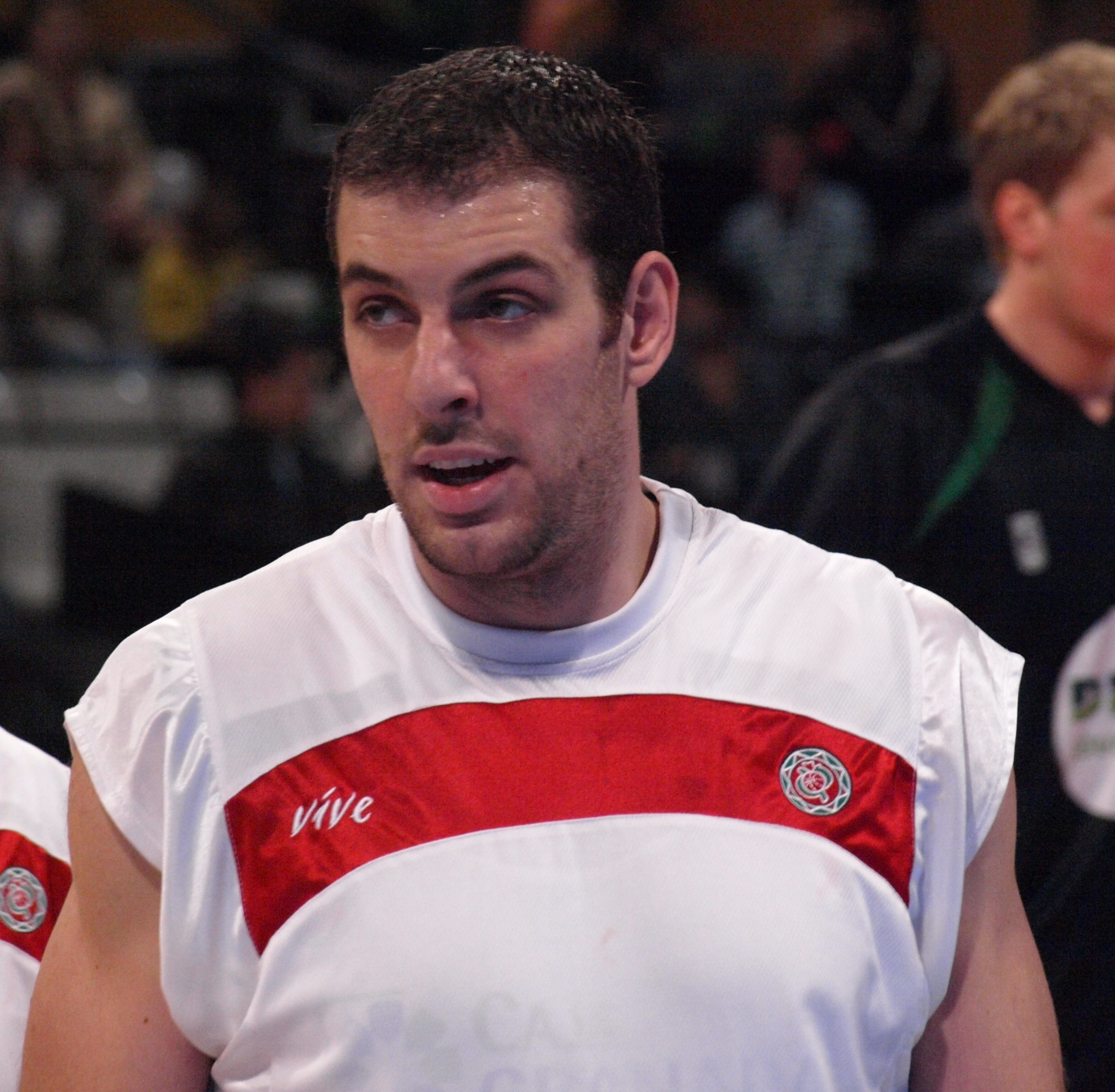
Aleks Marić

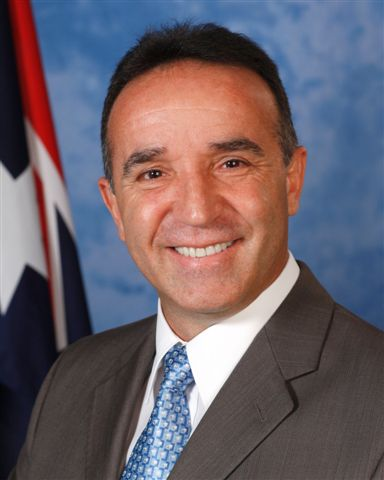
Andrew Nikolic

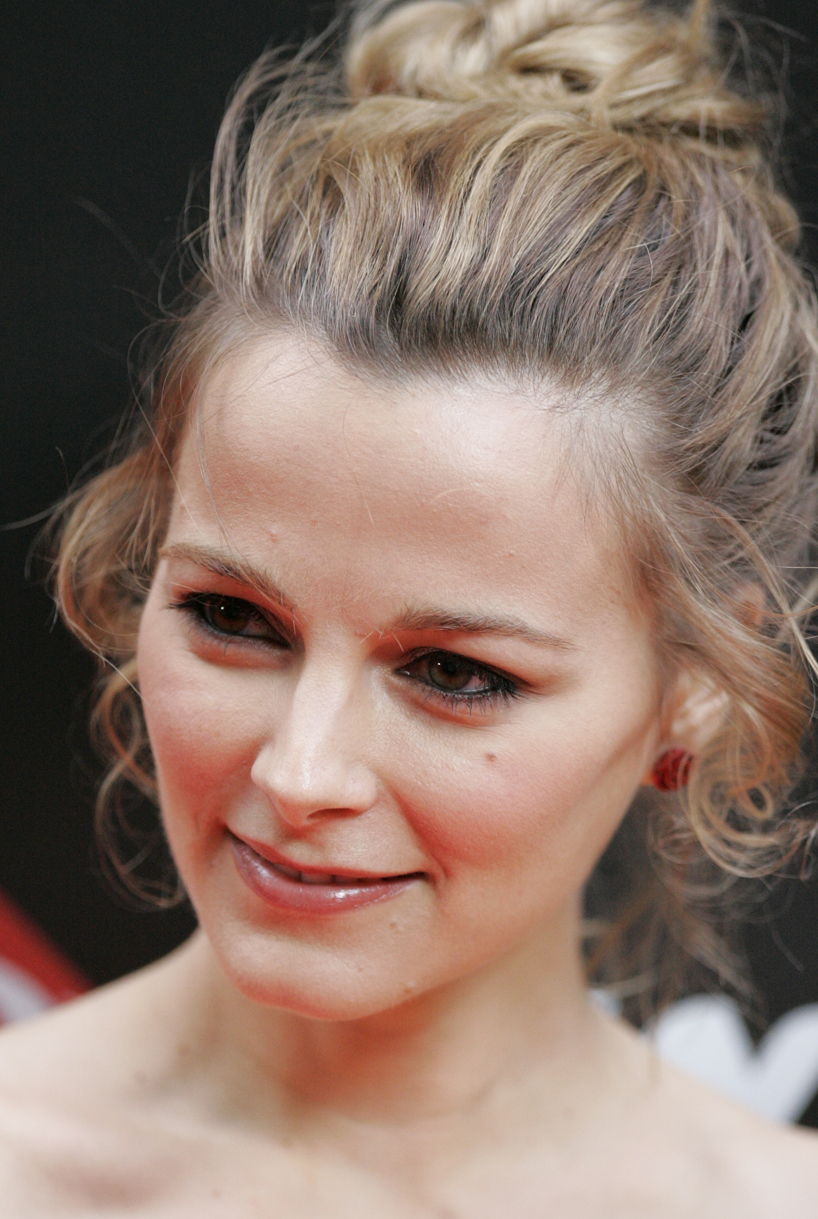
Bojana Novakovic

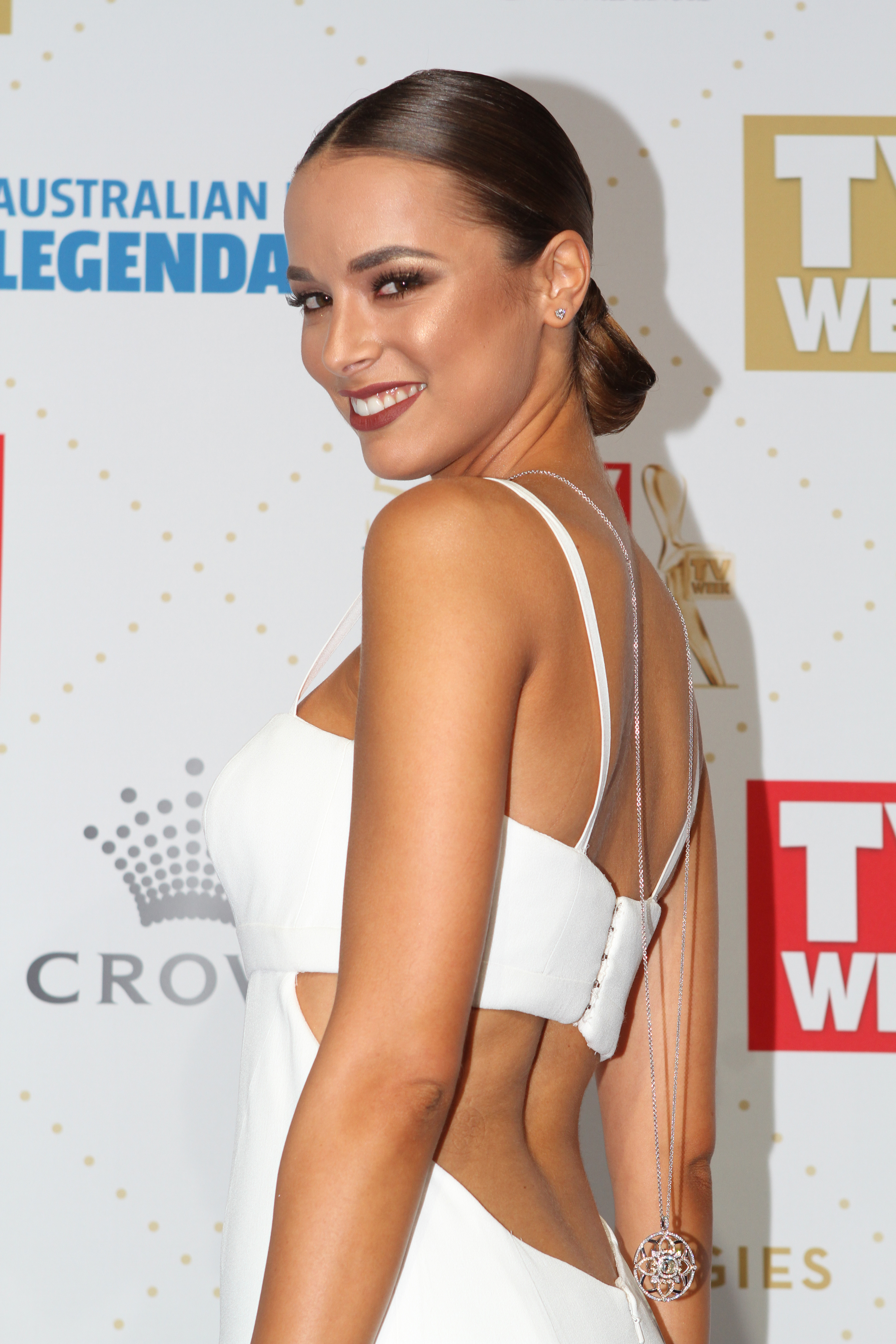
Monika Radulovic

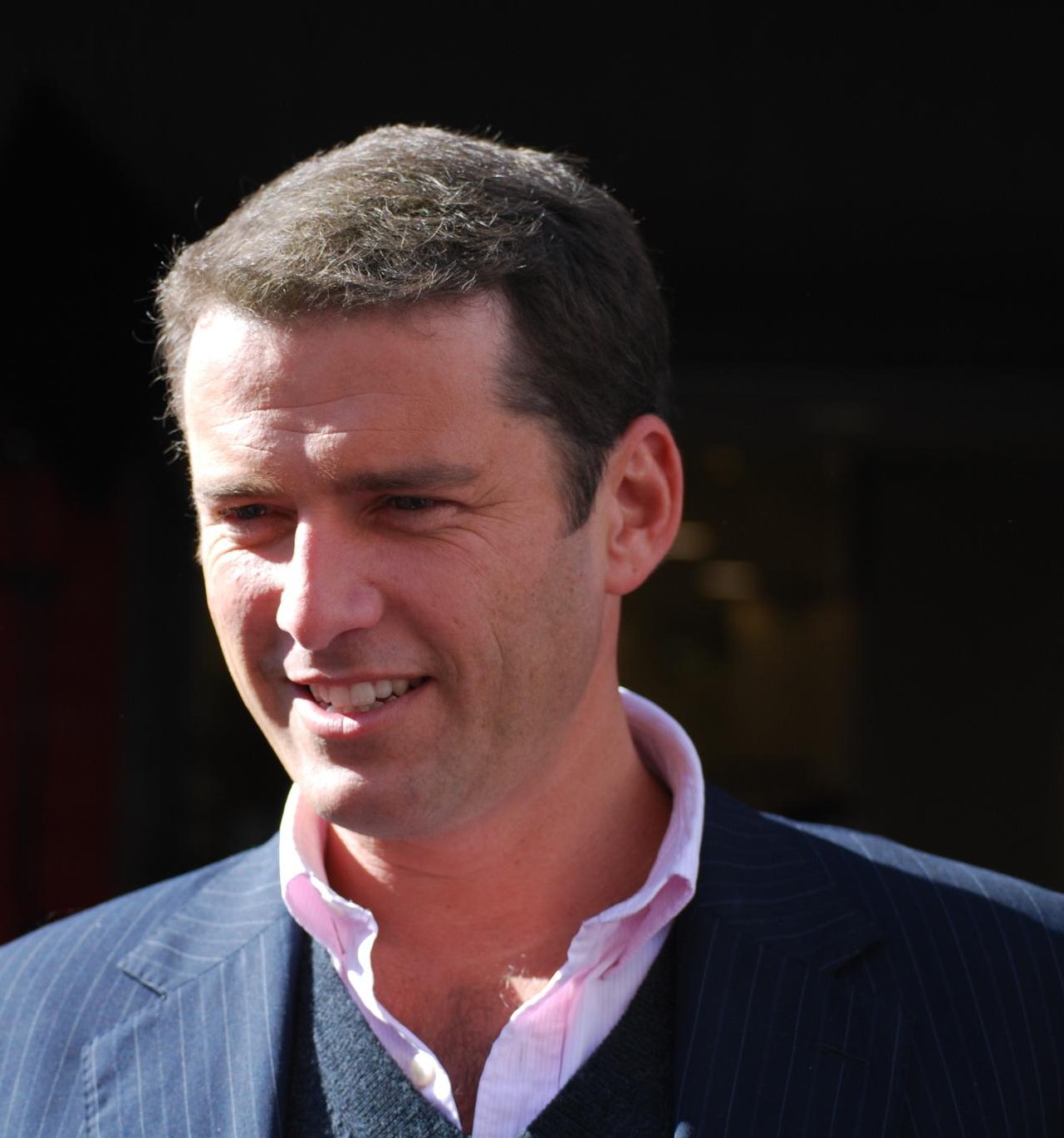
Karl Stefanovic

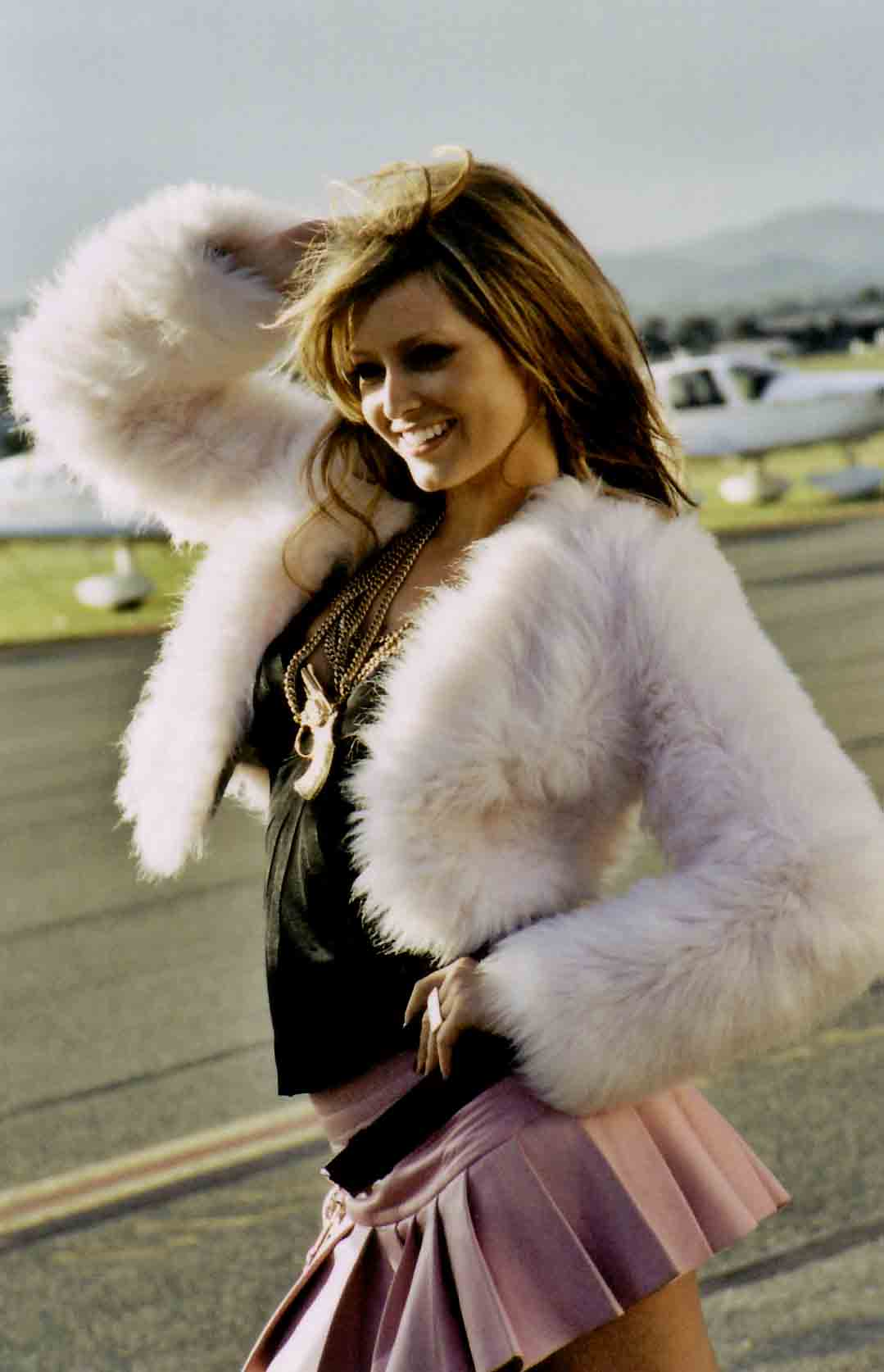
Holly Valance

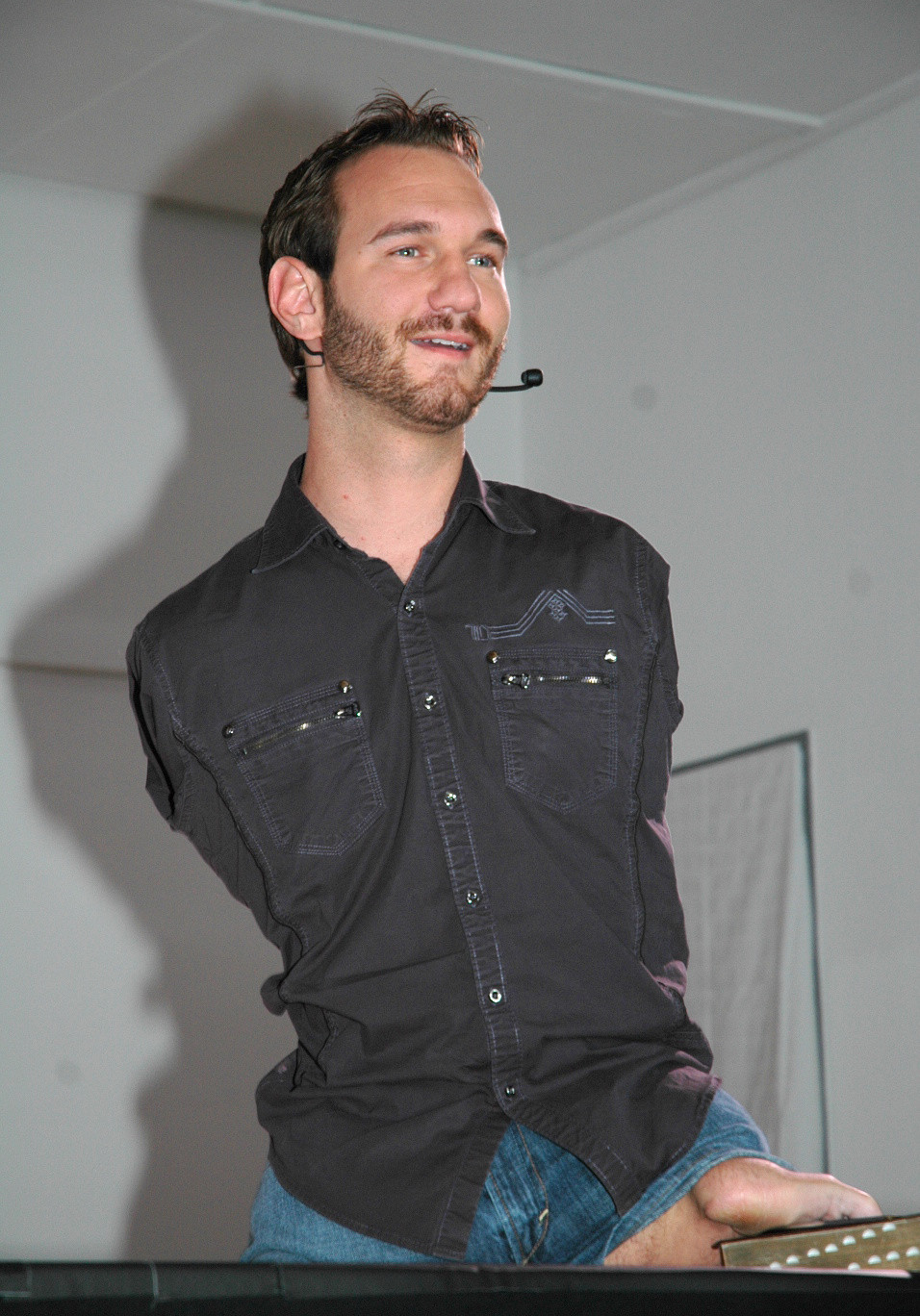
Nick Vujicic

- Alex Antic – politician
- Eli Babalj – soccer player
- Milan Blagojevic – soccer player
- Altiyan Childs – singer
- Nick Cotric – rugby league player
- Miloš Degenek – soccer player
- Biljana Dekic – Chess player
- Dirty South – musician
- Jelena Dokić – tennis player
- Ivan Ergić – soccer player
- Dan Ilic – comedian
- Luke Ivanovic – soccer player
- Marko Jesic – soccer player
- Sam Kekovich – Australian rules football player and media personality
- Nick Lalich – politician
- Ksenija Lukich – model and television personality
- Aleks Marić – basketball player
- Steven Marković – basketball player
- Katrina Milosevic - actress
- Nik Mrdja – soccer player
- Andrew Nikolic – politician
- Bojana Novakovic – actress
- Tom Opacic - rugby league player
- Andreja Pejic – model
- Monika Radulovic – model and beauty pageant titleholder
- Rale Rasic – soccer coach and media personality
- Tom Rogic – soccer player
- Karl Stefanovic – media personality
- Peter Stefanovic – media personality
- Aleksandar Šušnjar – soccer player
- Jake Trbojevic – rugby league player
- Tom Trbojevic – rugby league player
- Doug Utjesenovic - soccer player
- Holly Valance – actress, singer and model
- Olympia Valance – model and actress
- Nick Vujicic – Christian evangelist
- Danny Vukovic – soccer player
- B. Wongar – writer
- Ursula Yovich – actress and singer
- Lew Zivanovic – rugby league player

== See also ==
- Immigration to Australia
- European Australians
- Serb diaspora
- Australia–Serbia relations
- Serbian Orthodox Metropolitanate of Australia and New Zealand
- List of Serbian soccer clubs in Australia
