= John Botica =

New Zealand mosaic artist and designer

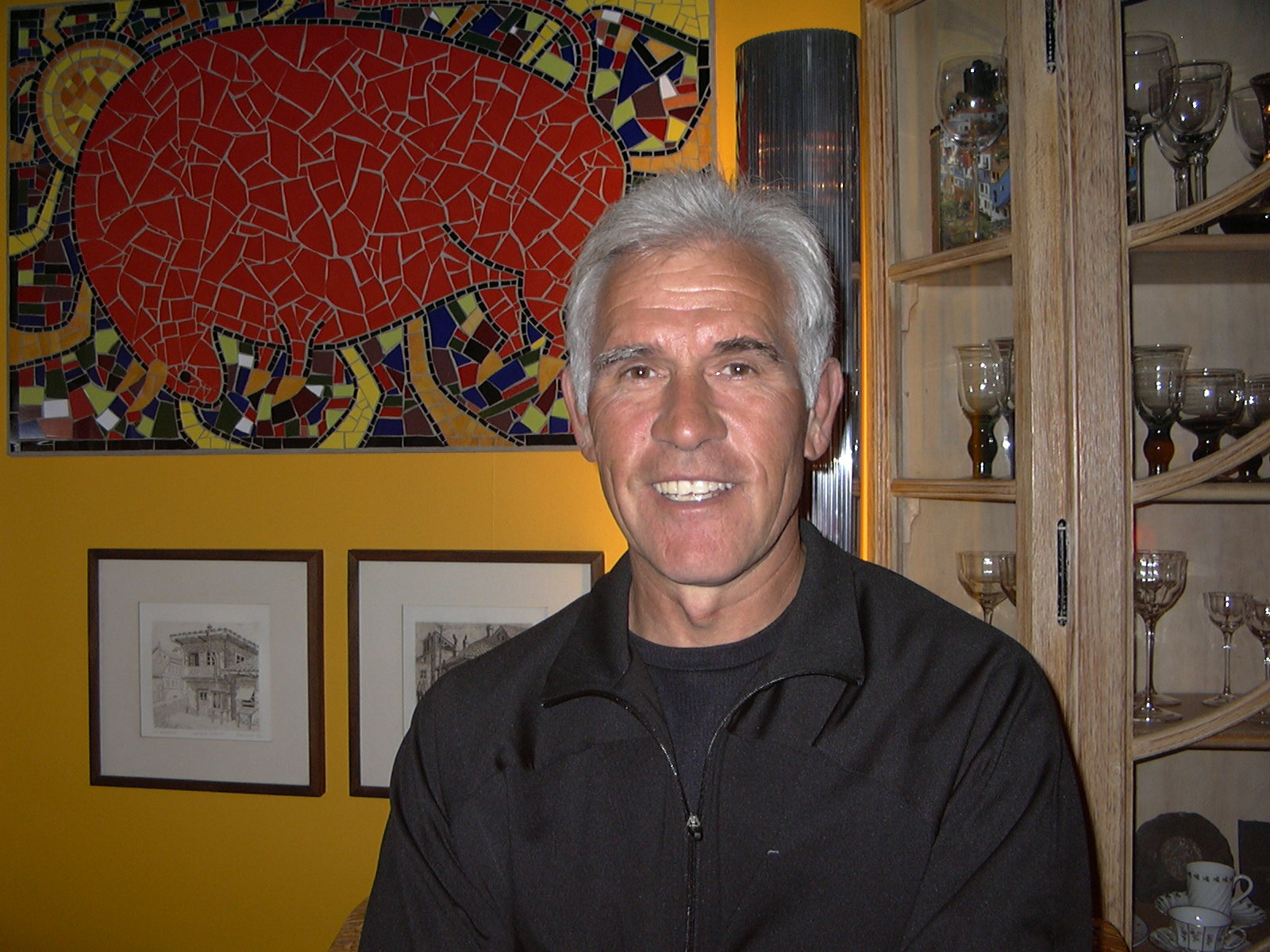
- John Botica in 2013
- Born: 24 May 1953 (age 72); Belgrade, Serbia
- Occupations: Pebble mosaic artist and tennis professional.

John Botica (born 24 May 1953) is a New Zealand pebble mosaic artist and a designer. He is based in Beachlands, Auckland, New Zealand.

== Life ==
Botica was born in Belgrade, Serbia, in 1953 and most of his life he was involved in tennis, being a tennis professional. He has lived in United States and Germany and has settled in New Zealand since 1997. In 2004 he was able to discover his true passion, namely pebble mosaic art establishing an innovative approach through bold usage of Maori and Polynesian motifs so common to his adopted country of New Zealand. "John Botica became interested in pebble mosaics when his uncle gave him a book on the subject. John was already an accomplished mosaicist, using bright ceramic tiles, and he was instantly intrigued by the textures and patterns that could be created using only natural pebbles". Botica has been involved in many private, and public commissions, he has created what is described in the specialist publication Mosaic Art Now, one of the world's top 100 contemporary mosaic works. Botica's ‘Tree of Life’ was commissioned by the North Shore City Council and installed at a children's playground in Greenhithe, with the latest public project at Bastion Point, a historic site.

In 2013 the St. Frajou Painting Museum, Haute Garonne, France, presented the preparatory drawings for the mosaics by Botica. In 2013, he also participated in National Mosaik Art Exhibition : Magic of Mosaic: Mosaic Symposium 2013 in the Helen Smith Meeting Room, Pataka + Museum, Auckland. Botica is a member of the Mosaic Association of Australia and New Zealand and a founding member of the Art Resilience movement created by Ksenia Milicevic in 2014 in Paris, France.
