= Serbian Orthodox Metropolitanate of Australia and New Zealand =

Diocese of the Serbian Orthodox Church

Location
- Territory: Australia and New Zealand
- Headquarters: Alexandria, New South Wales

Information
- Denomination: Eastern Orthodox
- Sui iuris church: Serbian Orthodox Church
- Established: 1964
- Cathedral: Saint George Cathedral, Cabramatta, New South Wales
- Language: Church Slavonic, Serbian, English

Current leadership
- Bishop: Siluan Mrakić

Website
- Serbian Orthodox Metropolitanate of Australia and New Zealand

The Serbian Orthodox Metropolitanate of Australia and New Zealand (Serbian: Српска православна митрополија аустралијско-новозеландска, romanized: Srpska pravoslavna mitropolija australijsko-novozelandska) is a metropolitan diocese of the Serbian Orthodox Church, with jurisdiction over Australia and New Zealand.

== Structure ==
The Serbian Orthodox Metropolitanate of Australia and New Zealand comprises 45 parishes: 42 in Australia (of which 15 in New South Wales; 11 in Victoria; 5 in Queensland; 4 in Western Australia; 3 in South Australia; 2 in Australian Capital Territory; and one each in Tasmania and Northern Territory) and 3 in New Zealand. The episcopal see is located at Saint George Cathedral, Cabramatta, New South Wales.

The diocese additionally administers 4 monasteries:

- Saint Sava - New Kalenich Serbian Orthodox Monastery (Wallaroo, New South Wales)
- Saint Sava Serbian Orthodox Monastery (Elaine, Victoria)
- Protection of the Most Holy Theotokos Serbian Orthodox Monastery (Tallong, New South Wales)
- Nativity of the Most Holy Theotokos Skete (Inglewood, South Australia)

== List of bishops ==
- Lavrentije Trifunović (1964–1974)
- Nikolaj Mrđa (1974–1980)
- Vasilije Vadić (1980–1986)
- Longin Krčo (1986–1992)
- Luka Kovačević (1993–1999)
- Nikanor Bogunović (1999–2003) (Note: Between 1999 and 2006, the bishop of the Eparchy of New Gračanica and Midwestern America administered the Eparchy of Australia and New Zealand.)
- Milutin Knežević (2003–2006)
- Irinej Dobrijević (2006–2016)
- Siluan Mrakić (2016–)

== Gallery ==
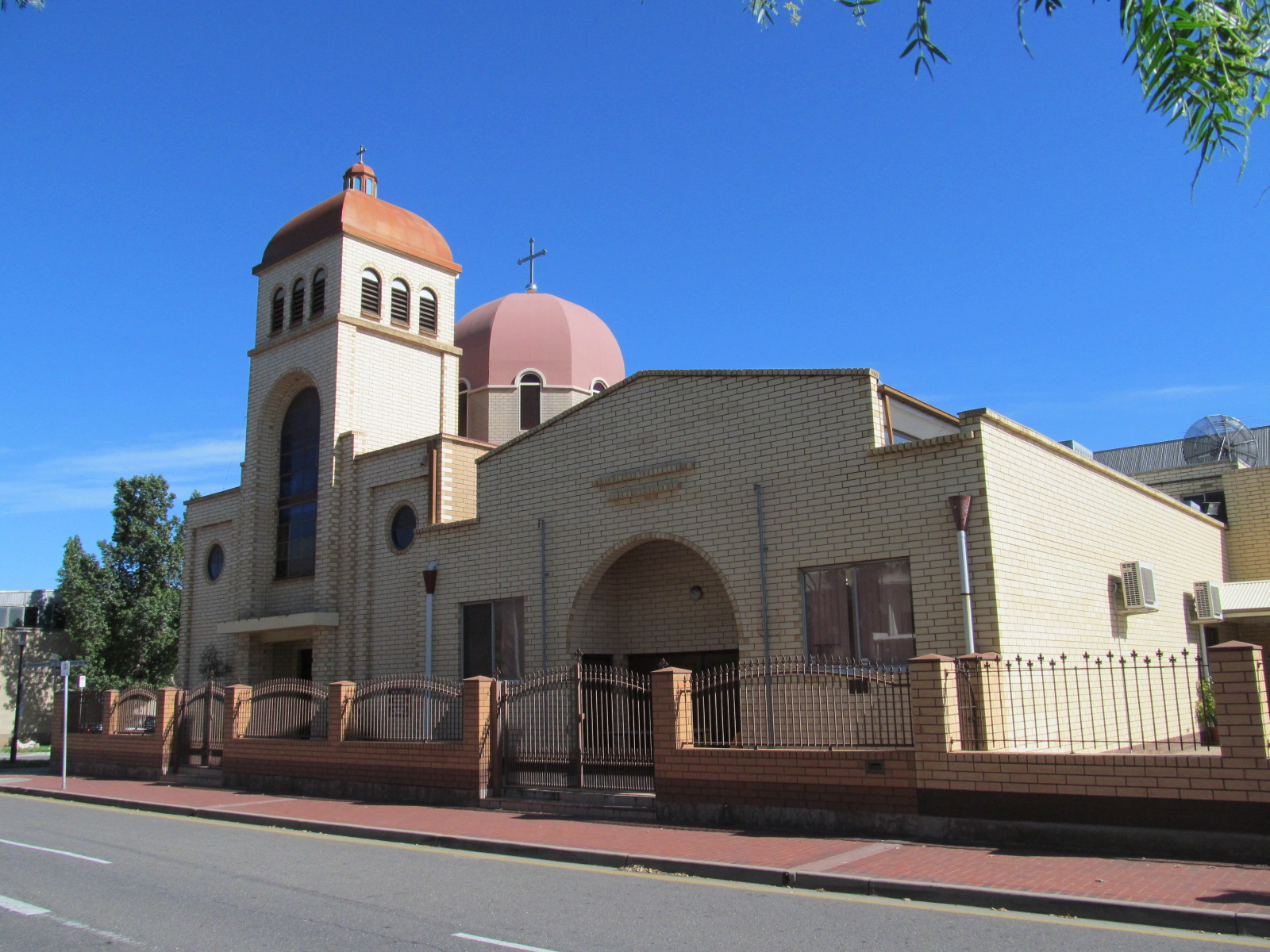
Saint Sava Church (Adelaide)

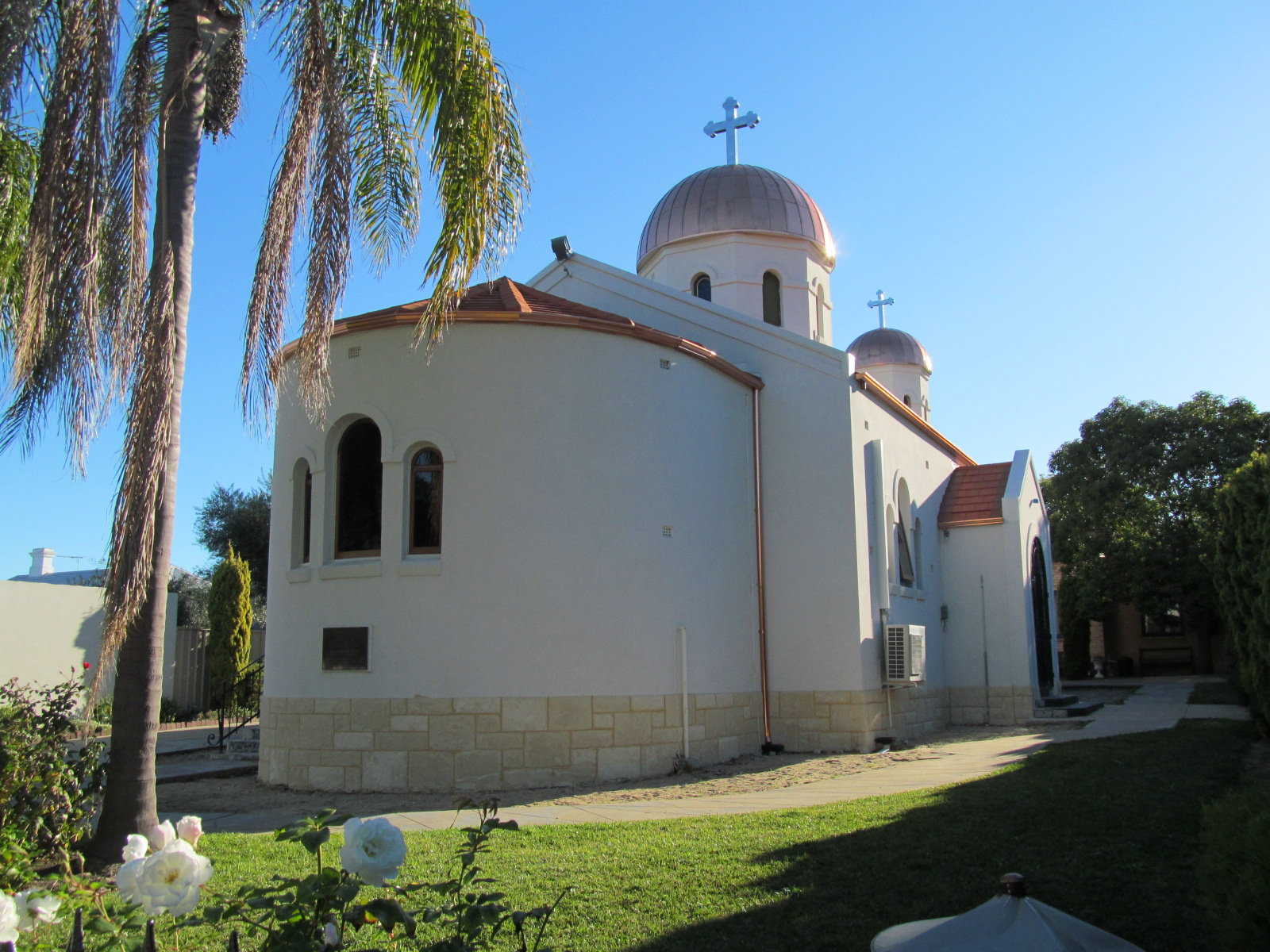
Saint Sava Church (Perth)

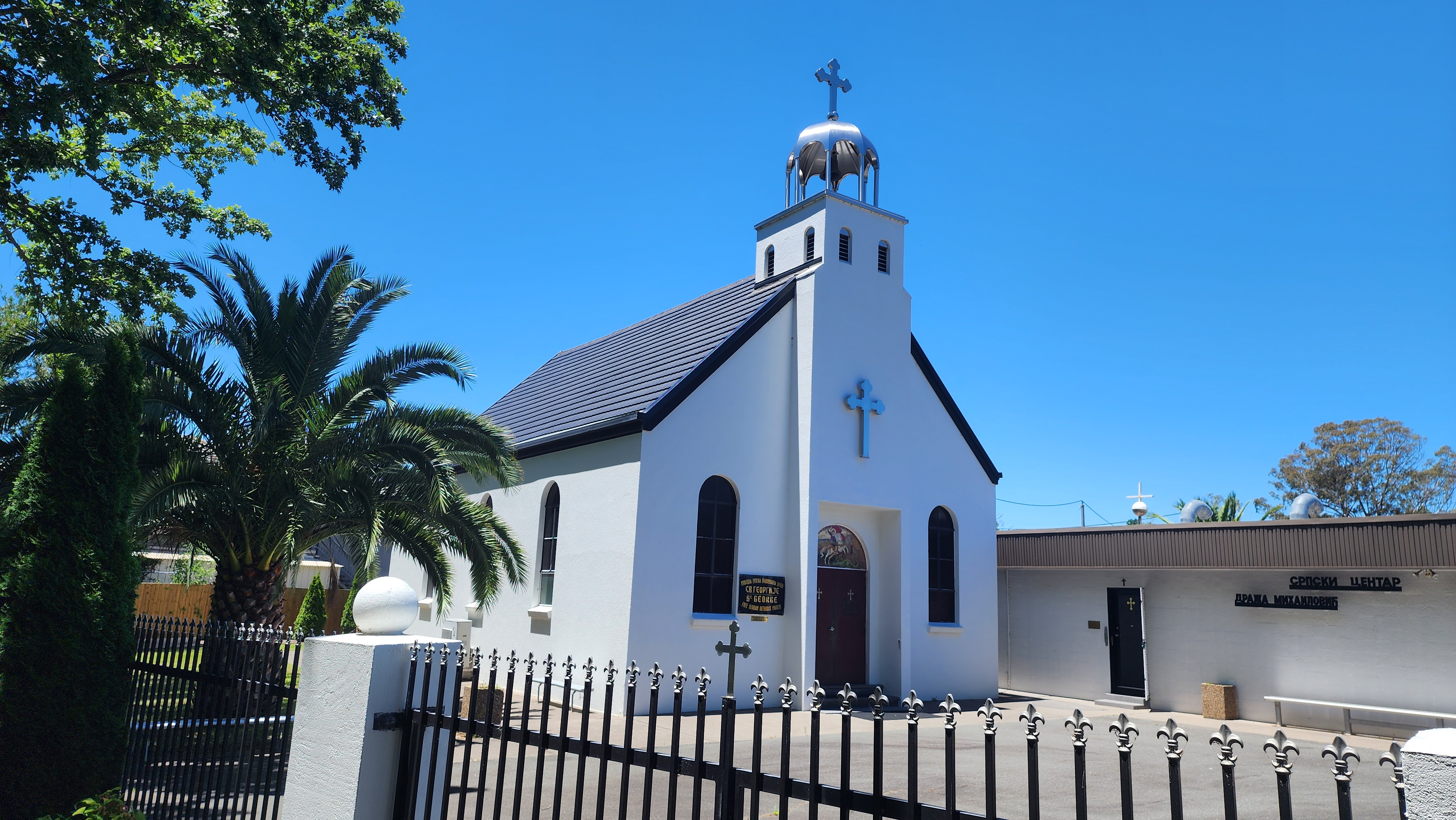
Saint George Church (Canberra)

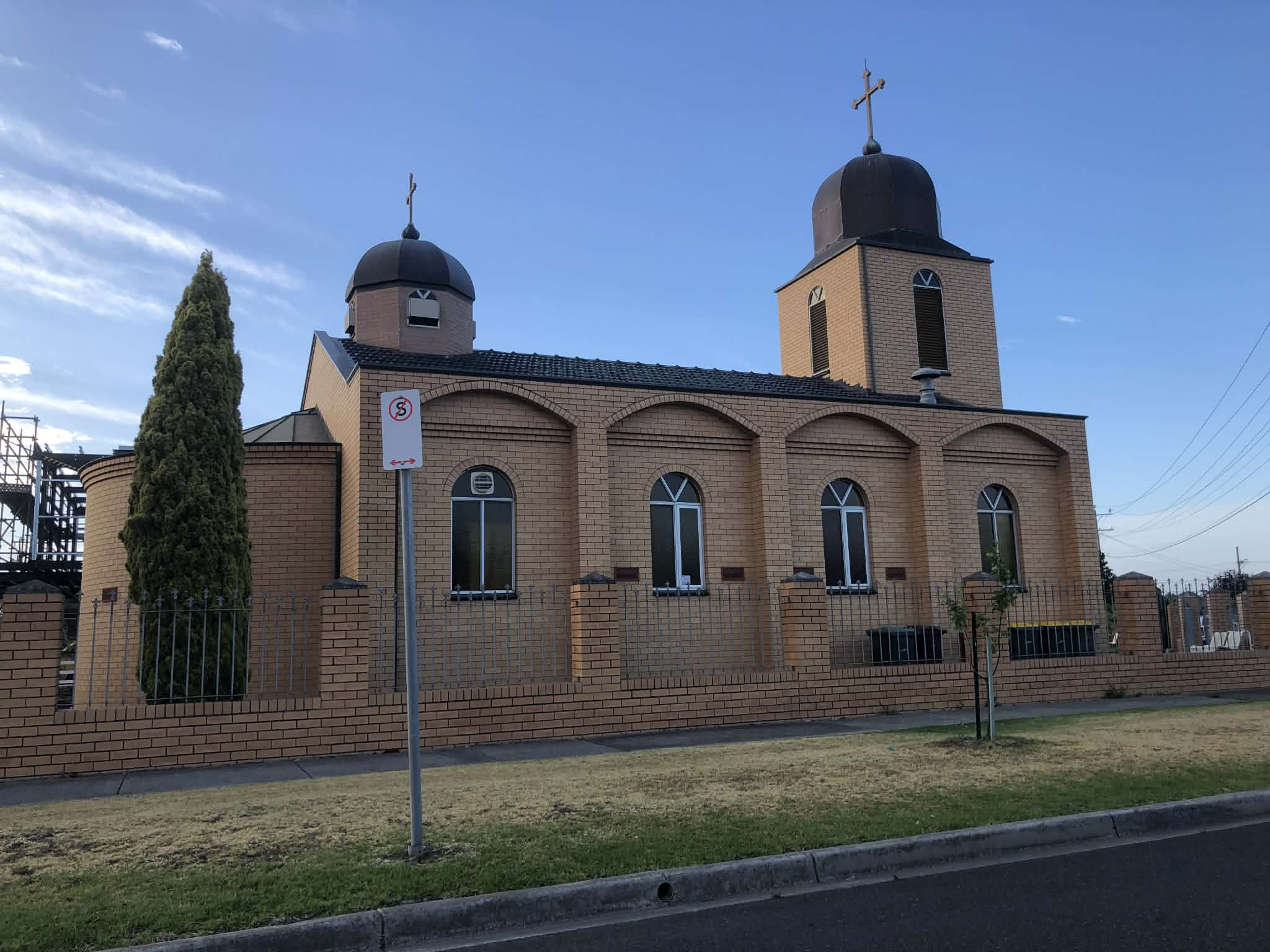
Saint Nicholas Church (Geelong)

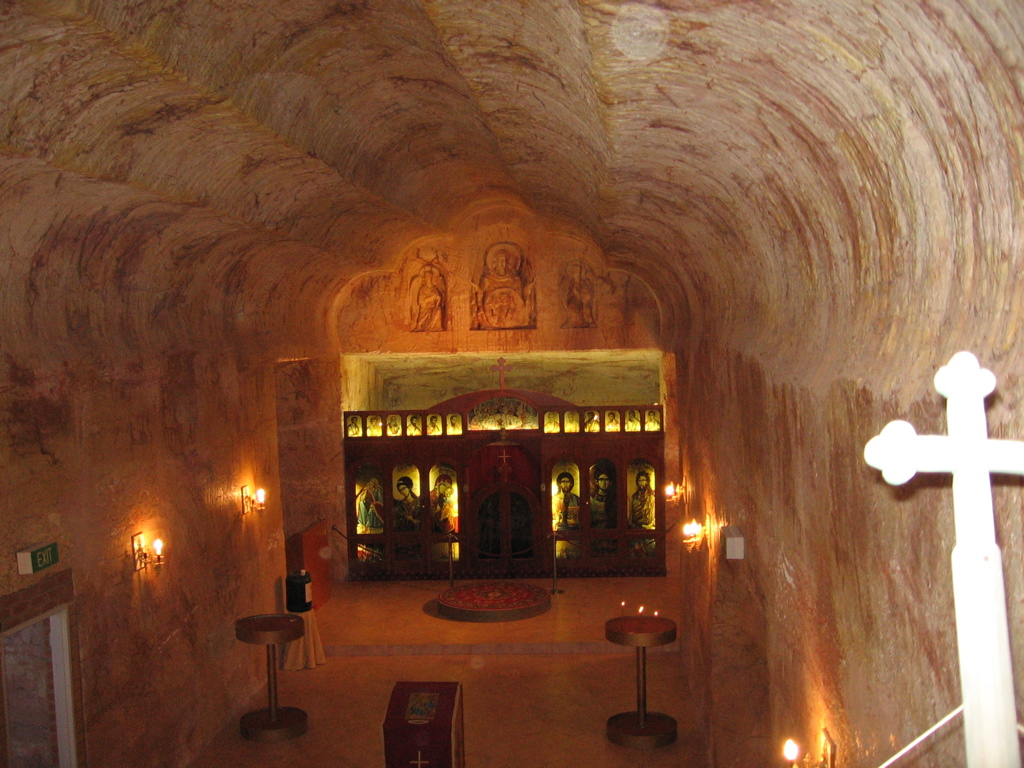
Saint Elijah the Prophet Church (Coober Pedy)

== See also ==
- Assembly of Canonical Orthodox Bishops of Australia, New Zealand, and Oceania
- Eparchies and metropolitanates of the Serbian Orthodox Church
- Serbian Australians
