= Irinej Kovačević =

Serbian Orthodox metropolitan (1914 – 1999)

His Eminence Irinej Kovačević
- Metropolitan bishop
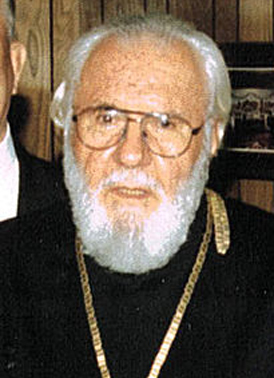
- Metropolitan Irinej in 1990
- Church: Serbian Orthodox Church
- Diocese: Diocese of New Gračanica
- Appointed: November 10, 1963
- Installed: December 7, 1963
- Term ended: February 2, 1999
- Predecessor: Dionisije (Milivojević)
- Successor: Longin (Krčo)

Orders
- Ordination: December 30, 1953 by Firmilijan (Ocokoljić)
- Consecration: December 7, 1963

Personal details
- Born: Milan Kovačević; September 6, 1914 Vrnčani, Gornji Milanovac, Kingdom of Serbia
- Died: February 2, 1999 (aged 84) Libertyville, Illinois, United States
- Denomination: Orthodox Christian
- Residence: Third Lake, Illinois

Irinej Kovačević (Serbian Cyrillic: Иринеј Ковачевић; 6 September 1914 – 2 February 1999) was the Metropolitan of the Free Serbian Orthodox Church in North America from 1963 until 1992. Metropolitan Irinej is best remembered within the Serbian Orthodox Church for leading a delegation to Belgrade in 1992 to heal the schism within the church that had spun off the North American, Western European and Australian Diocese as largely separate from the Belgrade-based church.

== Biography ==
Born Milan Kovačević in Vrnčani, then Kingdom of Serbia (today Serbia) in 1914, he graduated from the University of Belgrade and then became a teacher before the start of World War II. During the April 1941 invasion of the Kingdom of Yugoslavia by Nazi Germany, he served as a soldier in Serbian Royalist forces who simultaneously battled Hitler, Tito's Communists and Croatian Ustashi during World War II. After capitulation, he was arrested and sent to a POW camp in Germany. When the Allies liberated the military prison camps, he decided not return to his homeland after reading that the Old Regime was usurped by the Communists. In 1947, he emigrated from Germany to England where he entered the Serbian seminary at Dorchester on Thames. The Serbian seminarians were affectionately called the Dorchester Boys and most of them would eventually leave England for the United States, Canada, and elsewhere where they took up important positions in the Serbian Orthodox Church in North and South America, including Very Rev. Dimitrije Najdanović and Dr. Veselin Kesich among many others.

In 1950, he left England for the United States where he earned master's degrees from Saint Vladimir's Orthodox Theological Seminary and Columbia University. He became a tonsured monk at the Saint Sava Serbian Orthodox Monastery and Seminary in 1953, at which time he chose the name Iriney, meaning "peace" in Greek. In time he was elevated through all the monastic ranks to the title of archimandrite, superior abbot.

Archimandrite Irinej was consecrated vicar bishop in 1963 by his superior Bishop Dionsije (Milivojević) and later was elevated to the status of Metropolitan of the United States and Canada in 1984. His diocesan headquarters near Third Lake which includes the church of the Protection of the Most Holy Mother of God - New Gracanica, St. Sava Seminary, a monastery, recreational facilities and offices, was consecrated in 1984.

== Death ==
He died, aged 84, on 2 February 1999 in a Libertyvile nursing home where he had lived after suffering a stroke in 1996.

His Holiness Patriarch Pavle, titular head of the worldwide church who came to Third Lake from the New Serbian Patriarchal Palace in Belgrade to officiate the funeral of an old friend.
