= Christopher Kovacevich =

His Eminence Christopher (Kovacevich)
- Metropolitan
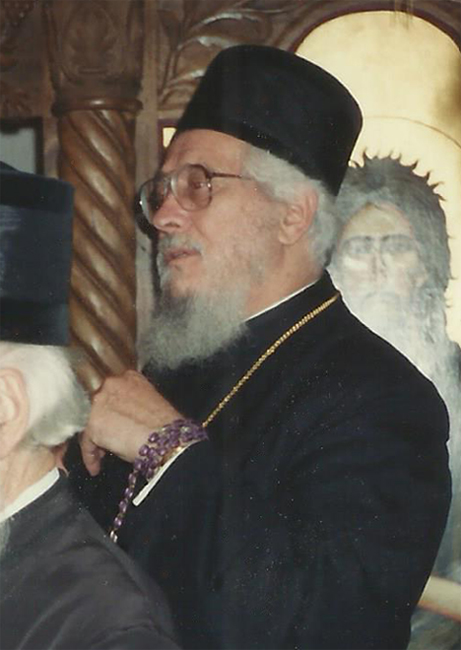
- Metropolitan Christopher in 1994
- Church: Serbian Orthodox Church

Personal details
- Born: Velimir Kovacevich; December 25, 1928 Galveston, Texas, United States
- Died: August 18, 2010 (aged 81) Chicago, Illinois, United States
- Denomination: Eastern Orthodox Christian

Christopher Kovacevich (Serbian: Христофор Ковачевић / Hristofor Kovačević; December 25, 1928 – August 18, 2010) was metropolitan bishop of Libertyville and Chicago in the Serbian Orthodox Church making him Primate of Serbian Orthodox Christians in America. He was also the first American-born bishop to serve a diocese of the Serbian Church in North America.

== Early life ==
Metropolitan Christopher (Kovacevich) was born in Galveston, Texas into a family of Serbian immigrants from Montenegro (he was the ninth of twelve children). His baptismal and secular name was Velimir Kovacevich (Serbian: Велимир Ковачевић / Velimir Kovačević). After graduation from high school, he attended Nashotah House, an Anglo-Catholic seminary of the Episcopal Church located in Nashotah, Wisconsin and subsequently studied and graduated from St. Sava Serbian Orthodox Seminary in Libertyville, Illinois where he learned Serbian. He earned a B.A. (Philosophy) and a Master of Letters (History) at the University of Pittsburgh and a Master of Divinity from Holy Cross Greek Orthodox School of Theology, Brookline, Massachusetts. He also completed courses and examinations for a doctorate at the Chicago Theological Seminary. Later in life, Metropolitan Christopher was awarded a Doctor of Divinity degree (honoris causa) by Nashotah House

== Priesthood ==
After graduating from St. Sava Serbian Orthodox Seminary he married the late Milka Kovacevich and afterward was ordained to the diaconate and priesthood in 1951. During his parochial ministry, he served Serbian Orthodox parishes in Johnstown, Pittsburgh, and Chicago. While ministering to parishes in the Pennsylvania and Chicago areas, he served as chaplain at four local universities.

Becoming a widower in 1970, he was elevated to the episcopate (i.e. he became a bishop) by the Bishops' Council of the Serbian Orthodox Church in Belgrade in 1978 and tonsured with the monastic name of Christopher, becoming the first American-born bishop to serve a diocese of the Serbian Church in North America (he was consecrated bishop of the Eastern American Diocese, serving in that capacity from 1978 until 1991). Upon the 70th anniversary of the Midwestern Diocese of the Serbian Orthodox Church in the United States in 1991, he was elevated to the rank of Metropolitan, making him the first metropolitan of the newly formed Metropolitanate of Midwestern America, thereby becoming the Primate of the Serbian Orthodox in America. In 2009, during the restructuring of the dioceses in the United States and Canada, the Metropolitanate of Midwestern America became the Metropolitanate of Libertyville-Chicago. In May 2010 he served as secretary of the North American Episcopal Assembly of the Orthodox Church.

Metropolitan Christopher also frequently returned to the city of his birth to preside at weddings and baptisms at Saints Constantine and Helen Serbian Orthodox Church.

== Death ==
Metropolitan Christopher died on August 18, 2010, in Libertyville, Illinois due to complications from bone, brain, and stomach cancer. He is interred in the Saint Sava Serbian Orthodox Monastery cemetery.

Serbian Orthodox Church titles
Preceded by Sava Vuković	Bishop of Eastern America and Canada; 1978 – 1983	Succeeded by Georgije Đokić (as Bishop of Canada)
Preceded by himself as the Bishop of Eastern America and Canada	Bishop of Eastern America; 1983 – 1991	Succeeded by Mitrofan Kodić
Vacant Title last held by Firmilijan Ocokoljić	Metropolitan Bishop of Midwestern America; 1991 – 2009	Diocese abolished, succeeded by the Metropolitanate of Libertyville and Chicago
New diocese	Metropolitan Bishop of Libertyville and Chicago; 2009 – 2010	Diocese abolished
