= Saint Sava Serbian Orthodox Church (Merrillville, Indiana) =

Serbian Orthodox church in Merrillville, Indiana

- Saint Sava Serbian Orthodox Church
- 41.4519°N 87.3147°W
- Location: 9191 Mississippi Street, Merrillville, Indiana
- Country: United States
- Denomination: Serbian Orthodox Church
- Website: saintsava.net

History
- Status: Parish church
- Founded: 1914
- Dedication: Saint Sava
- Consecrated: May 18, 1991

Architecture
- Functional status: Active
- Architect(s): Milojko Perišić; Radovan Pejović
- Architectural type: Byzantine Style
- Years built: 1985-1991
- Groundbreaking: July 31, 1985

Specifications
- Capacity: 400 seats
- Length: Overall 376 feet (115 m)
- Height: Cross on the center cupola rests 97 feet (30 m) above the ground
- Materials: American steel, Indiana limestone, and Appalachian oak wood

Administration
- Diocese: Serbian Orthodox Eparchy of Eastern America

Clergy
- Bishop: Longin Krčo
- Priest: Stavrofor Marko Matić

The Saint Sava Serbian Orthodox Church (Serbian: Српска православна црква Светог Саве, romanized: Srpska pravoslavna crkva Svetog Save) is an Eastern Orthodox church originally located in Gary, Indiana, and since the consecration of the new church building in 1991 in Merrillville, Indiana. It is under jurisdiction of the Serbian Orthodox Eparchy of Eastern America of the Serbian Orthodox Church and is dedicated to Saint Sava, the first Archbishop of the Serbian Orthodox Church. It is the "church-school congregation" - the term generally used by Serbs in place of "parish", a word that carries historical associations with Catholic or Protestant ecclesiastical structures.

The Saint Sava Serbian Orthodox Church is where Saint Varnava, the first American-born Serb to be proclaimed an Orthodox saint, was baptized and served as an altar boy.

It is recognized as being among "10 Beautiful Region Cathedrals and Churches" in Northwest Indiana and one of the Midwest's oldest parishes, founded by early Serbian settlers in the United States seeking to establish their local community with the building of a church to help maintain their traditional customs. It is among the churches in the Northwest Indiana region that enjoy the status of institutional landmarks.

Owing to its religious and ethnic importance to Serbian Americans, it is nicknamed the "Srpska Gera."

== History ==
The Saint Sava Serbian Orthodox Church-School Congregation began with a large population of Serbian people who settled in the Gary area and served an important role in maintaining the Serbian culture while also helping Serbian immigrants adapt to mainstream America.

In 1912, before any official church congregation was established, a group of Serbs in Gary founded the first Serbian School at 14th and Massachusetts Streets. The first teacher of the school was Paul Veljkov, who later became a priest and would be the second priest to serve the Saint Sava Church-School Congregation after it was established in 1914.

The Saint Sava Serbian Orthodox Church-School Congregation was established February 15, 1914, and incorporated on April 16, 1914.

The first church building was consecrated on June 13, 1915, at 20th and Connecticut streets in Gary.

At the beginning of the 1920s, internal provincial divisiveness within the congregation was so great that it led to a division. A second parish, known as Holy Resurrection, was founded at 39th and Washington Streets in the Glen Park section of Gary. The parishes had reunified by the late 1930s. In 1937 the cornerstone was laid for the new church, which was consecrated November 24, 1938.

By the end of the 1950s the Saint Sava Serbian Orthodox Church-School Congregation was the largest Eastern Orthodox church in Gary.

In the beginning of the 1960s, a portion of the membership separated itself from the congregation at St. Sava to form the Macedonian Orthodox Church and a religious and cultural center was established in Crown Point, Indiana.

In 1963, a schism at the highest levels of the Serbian Orthodox Church resulted in the defrocking of Bishop Dionisije and a division in the Serbian Orthodox diaspora. A bitter conflict ensued with attendant lawsuits in civil courts for nearly three decades. Locally, this schism also resulted in a portion of the membership separating from the Saint Sava Church-School Congregation and forming the new congregation of Saint Elijah, which established a church and cultural center in Crown Point.

Also in the early 1960s, the parish priest of Saint Sava Church, Hieromonk Petar Bankerović, later Bishop of Australia-New Zealand, was attacked and beaten outside the church, which left him with permanent physical impairments.

The second building of the congregation, dedicated in 1939, was destroyed by a fire in the late afternoon and early evening of February 16, 1978.

In the weeks following the fire a small hall was used as a chapel until the consecration of the new church building in 1991 in Merrillville, Indiana.

In 1982, the membership of the congregation approved a building program on Mississippi Street. for a new church whose construction began in 1985 and which was consecrated on May 18, 1991.

== Architecture ==
The architectural design of the exterior central portion of the current St. Sava church building was modeled in the Byzantine architecture style after the Oplenac, a church located in Topola, Serbia. The central part of the church structure shares many similarities in its physical features and likeness to the Oplenac.

Upon completion of construction of the main structure in 1990, the Illinois Indiana Masonry Council honored Saint Sava Serbian Orthodox Church with the Gold Medal Award for Excellence in Masonry Design citing the work of Architect Radovan Pejović and Mason Contractor Gacesa Masonry Construction.

The nave, or center of the church, is 60 by 100 feet (18 m × 30 m) with a center cupola rising more than 90 feet (27 m) high. The church can accommodate up to 500 people.

== See also ==
- Serbian Orthodox Eparchy of Eastern America
- Serbian Orthodox Church in North and South America
- Serbian Americans
