= Mitrofan Kodić =

Serbian Orthodox bishop (born 1951)

His Eminence Mitrofan (Kodić)
- Metropolitan
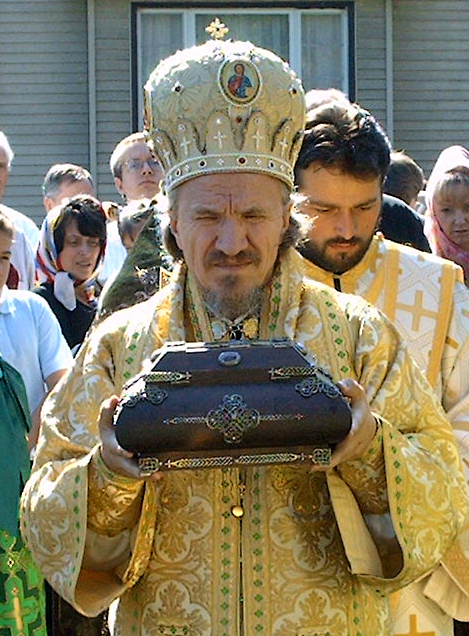
- Bishop Mitrofan alongside ROCOR clergy with the relics of Saint Sergius in 2006
- Church: Serbian Orthodox Church
- Diocese: Diocese of Canada
- Appointed: May 25, 2016
- Installed: September 18, 2016
- Predecessor: Patriarch Irinej (administrator)
- Previous post: Bishop of the Diocese of Eastern America (1991–2016)

Orders
- Ordination: December 3, 1970 by Stefan (Boca)
- Consecration: July 12, 1987 by Serbian Patriarch German

Personal details
- Born: Radovan Kodić; August 4, 1951 (age 75) Ljuša, PR Bosnia and Herzegovina, FPR Yugoslavia
- Denomination: Orthodox Christian
- Residence: Campbellville, Ontario
- Education: University of Bucharest; University of Belgrade

Mitrofan Kodić (Serbian Cyrillic: Митрофан Кодић; born August 4, 1951) is a Serbian Orthodox bishop who has served as the head of the Serbian Orthodox Eparchy of Canada since 2016. He was formerly the Bishop of the Eastern American Eparchy.

In English, his name is sometimes spelled as Mitrophan.

== Biography ==
He was born on August 4, 1951 in Ljuša in the municipality of Šipovo. He was ordained as a hierodeacon by Bishop Stefan (Boca) on December 4, 1970 after which he completed his Seminary studies at Krka monastery in 1971. He was ordained a hieromonk on January 6, 1974. He graduated from the University of Bucharest Faculty of Orthodox Theology in 1975 where one of his professors was Dumitru Stăniloae. He learned Romanian during his time as a student. He then returned to Krka monastery where he was named assistant Rector of the Seminary in 1980 and Rector in 1987.

In May 1987, he was elected by the Holy Assembly of Bishops of the Serbian Orthodox Church to be the vicar bishop of the Diocese of Toplica. On July 12, 1987, during the Divine Liturgy at the St. Michael's Cathedral in Belgrade, Patriarch German, together with four bishops, sixteen priests and eleven deacons, ordained him to the episcopate. He was also appointed assistant to the Administrator of the Diocese of Midwestern America, Bishop Sava (Vuković). He was appointed as Administrator of the Diocese of Midwestern America in 1988, and became Bishop of Eastern America in 1991.

In 1997, he earned his ThD, with the defense of his doctoral dissertation at the University of Belgrade Faculty of Orthodox Theology on the theme of "The Mystery of Christ According to the Epistles to the Ephesians, Philippians and Colossians of the Holy Apostle Paul".

Along with Jesse Jackson, he played a key role in securing the release of three American GIs held captive during the NATO bombing of Yugoslavia in 1999.

He is also a Professor of the New Testament at the St. Sava School of Theology in Libertyville, Illinois.

At the regular session of the Holy Assembly of Bishops of the Serbian Orthodox Church on May 18, 2024, Bishop Mitrofan was elevated to the rank of Metropolitan bishop. His new title is Archbishop of Toronto and Metropolitan of Canada.

== Works ==
He translated from the Romanian Dumitru Stăniloae's Community and Spirituality in the Orthodox Liturgy, three volumes of Orthodox Dogmatics, The Immortal Image of God, Orthodox Moral Theology, and The Gospel Image of Christ by Dumitru Stăniloae, and The Romanian Patericon I and II and the Dictionary of Orthodox Theology by hieromonk Ioanichie Bălan.

He has written two books: The Teaching of St. Apostle Paul on the Church, published in 1991 in Chicago (now translated into English) and Introduction to the Holy Scriptures of the New Testament.

Serbian Orthodox Church titles
Preceded by Christopher Kovacevich	Bishop of Eastern America; 1991 – 2016	Succeeded by Irinej Dobrijević
Preceded by Georgije Đokić	Bishop of Canada; 2016 – present	Incumbent
