= Dionisije Milivojević =

Serbian Orthodox bishop (1898–1979)

Dionisije
- Bishop of America and Canada
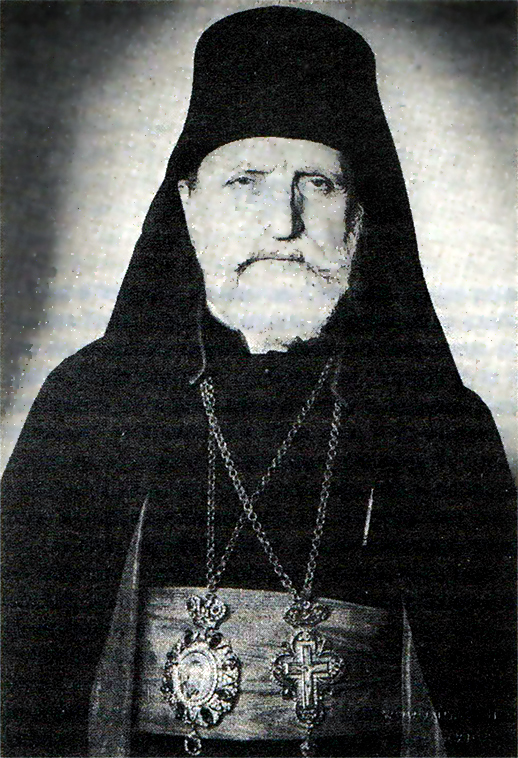
- Native name: Дионисије
- Church: Serbian Orthodox Church
- Diocese: Eparchy of America and Canada
- Elected: 1939
- Installed: 15 April 1940
- Predecessor: Irinej Đorđević
- Successor: Irinej Kovačević; Position officially abolished
- Previous post: Vicar bishop of Moravica (1938–1939)

Personal details
- Born: Dragoljub Milivojević; 26 July 1898 Rabrovac, Kingdom of Serbia
- Died: 15 May 1979 (aged 80) Libertyville, Illinois, United States
- Buried: Saint Sava Monastery, Libertyville, Illinois
- Denomination: Serbian Orthodox
- Education: University of Belgrade Faculty of Theology

Dionisije Milivojević (Serbian Cyrillic: Дионисије Миливојевић; 26 July 1898 – 15 May 1979) was a Serbian Orthodox bishop who served as Bishop of America and Canada from 1939 to 1964.

In his youth, he was one of the leaders of the evangelical Bogomoltsy Movement which won the support of Bishop Nikolaj Velimirović.

In 1964, he severed ties with the Serbian Orthodox Patriarchate in Belgrade, which he considered to be under the control of the Yugoslav Communist regime, and formed the Free Serbian Orthodox Church. He was a vocal anti-communist and believed that the clergy in Yugoslavia had acquiesced to the ruling League of Communists of Yugoslavia too easily, and asserted the independence of the congregations of the SOC in North America and Australia.

== Early life ==
Dionisije was born Dragoljub Milivojević on 26 July 1898 in Rabrovac near Smederevska Palanka. After graduating from gymnasium, he enrolled at the University of Belgrade Faculty of Law. Two years later, he enrolled at the University of Belgrade Faculty of Orthodox Theology where he graduated.

Upon graduation, he got married. His wife died shortly afterward, whereupon he went to Hilandar Monastery, where he received tonsure and was given the monastic name of Dionisije. Before he was elevated to the position of Vicar Bishop, he was the head of a monastery, a professor at the seminary in Sremski Karlovci, and the head of the monastic school in Dečani Monastery. At the same time, he was one of the leaders of the Bogomoltsy Movement, in which he had been active since his student days. He edited the organization's newspaper Christian Community, until 1933.

He was elevated to the position of Bishop of Moravica and Vicar Bishop to Patriarch Gavrilo in 1938 and was consecrated in August of that year at the Saborna crkva. In late 1939, he was selected Bishop of America and Canada. He departed for the United States in early April 1940.

== Bishop of America and Canada in the SOC ==
He took over the administration of the Diocese of America and Canada on 15 April 1940, on the eve of the outbreak of World War II.

He started his work in the Diocese from Saint Sava Monastery in Libertyville, Illinois. He first relocated the Diocese's headquarters from Chicago to the monastery, which he renovated completely. Between 1941 and 1943, he increased the monastery's property by 73 acres. In 1950, he purchased a 1,400-acre farm with buildings for the elderly and a children's resort in Shadeland, near Springboro, Pennsylvania. In Jackson, California, he purchased 173 acres of land. He organized a number of parishes and church-school municipalities. One of the most significant undertakings by Bishop Dionisije was his work in bringing and rescuing Serbs from the prison camps of Germany, Italy and Austria after the end of World War II. According to records, 16,000 Serbs and about 30 priests were brought to the US and Canada on the basis of letters of guarantee signed by Dionisije.

== Separation from the SOC and death ==
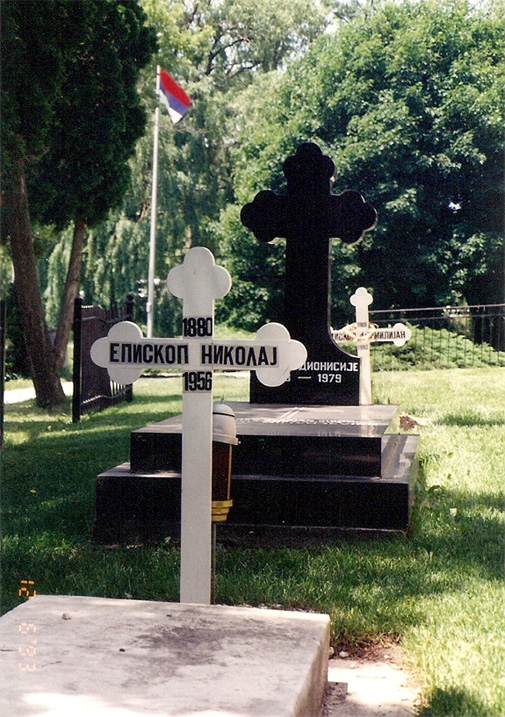
Grave of Bishop Dionisije (in the back), Libertyville, IL

By the early 1960s, the SOC's stance toward the communist authorities had become a standing source of friction between Bishop Dionisije and Patriarch German in Belgrade. Like most churches under communism, the SOC had found a modus vivendi in order to procure the space it needed to operate.

A delegation from the Serbian Orthodox Church was sent to the United States to meet Dionisije and stayed with him for two months during 1962. After having returned to Belgrade, the group generally spoke positively of Dionisije, but also brought forward some adverse. For this reason, the Holy Assembly of Bishops requested that the Holy Synod start a trial against Dionisije on 10 May 1963, the same day that his Diocese was split into three newly created ones.

A new delegation met with Dionisije in July 1963, when he presented them with a written response to their letter. At the same time, he published announcements against the Assembly, claiming that everything they did was to appease the communist regime in Belgrade. He was removed from the position of bishop at an extraordinary assembly on 27 July 1963. Dionisije then called upon all parishes opposed to Belgrade to join him, and called upon a church-popular assembly on 10–14 November 1963 when all decisions from Belgrade were dismissed until the fall of communism. Dionisije's successor, Irinej Kovačević, was consecrated at this assembly.

In mid-October 1963, Bishop Dionisije was at the forefront of the local Serbs' campaign against Josip Broz Tito's visit to the United States. They organized press conferences, picket lines, demonstrations and harangued San Francisco's Fairmont Hotel where he was staying. Tito canceled several receptions, as well as his West Coast tour.

He was defrocked at the Holy Assembly of Bishops in March 1964. In Australia, he initiated the first church-popular assembly in Melbourne on 31 October 1964, where the new Diocese of Australia and New Zealand was created, recognizing Dionisije as its leader and rejecfting canonical submission to the Belgrade Patriarchy which it considered unduly influenced by the Communist regime. The clergy loyal to Bishop Dionisije became known among Patriarchy supporters as the raskolnici (English: schismatics) while those loyal to Belgrade were derisively calle federalci, a play on words from the official title [Federal People's Republic] of the Yugoslav Communist state. (English: federals).

The row even split the exiled royal family. King Peter II originally sided with the raskolnici, but later retracted his support. Prince Andrew supported the raskolnici, and Princes Tomislav and Alexander the federalci. Peter II was interred in the Saint Sava Monastery in 1970, still under the control of Dionisije-loyals. It is alleged either that this signifies his renewed support for Dionisije before death, or that his corpse was taken from the Denver hospital where he died without permission.

Dionisije was forced to leave the church's seat in Saint Sava Monastery and transferred to the nearby Grayslake following a court ruling in favor of the SOC with regards to ownership of the monastery. He and Metropolitan Irinej Kovačević built a new seat, the New Gračanica Monastery in Third Lake, Illinois. It was completed in 1984.

Starting in 1977, the group assumed the name Free Serbian Orthodox Church. It was canonically reconciled with the Serbian Orthodox Church in 1992, after the demise of Communism in Yugoslavia.

He died on 15 May 1979 at Saint Sava Monastery in Libertyville, Illinois. He was buried by the monastery's church.

== See also ==
- Serbian Orthodox Diocese v. Milivojevich

== Literature ==
- Hockenos, Paul (2003). Homeland Calling: Exile Patriotism & the Balkan Wars. Cornell University Press. ISBN 978-0-8014-4158-5.
- Puzović, Predrag (1996). "Епархије Српске православне цркве у расејању" (PDF). Богословље: Часопис Православног богословског факултета у Београду (in Serbian). 40 (1–2): 87–96.
