= St. Sava Academy =

Coordinates: 41°58′59.1″N 87°49′39.1″W

Location
- 5701 N. Redwood Dr. Chicago, Illinois, United States

Information
- Type: Private
- Established: 2001
- Enrollment: 90 students

St. Sava Academy is a Serbian-American private school located in the city of Chicago Illinois, United States. The school offers schooling for children in kindergarten to the 8th grade. The school is in cooperation with the Serbian Orthodox Church, and seeks to promote bilingual education and cultural growth to the city's Serbian community. Instruction is in Serbian and English.

The school was established in 2001, originally being in a union with the Greek-American School "Socrates".

There is another Serbian-American day school, the St. Sava Orthodox School, in Milwaukee.

== See also ==
- Saint Sava Serbian Orthodox Church
- St. Sava Orthodox School
