= Dimitrije Najdanović =

Serbian theologian, writer, and Orthodox Christian priest

- Димитрије Најдановић
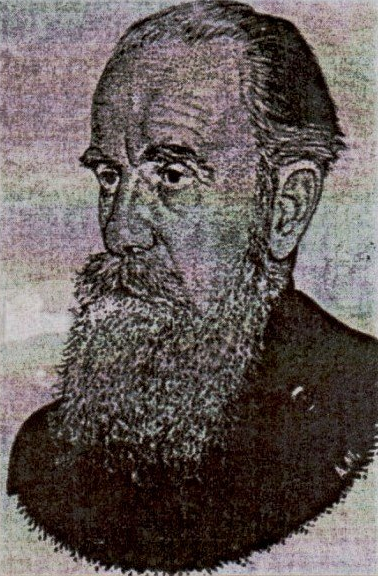
- Born: 7 June 1897; Kragujevac, Kingdom of Serbia
- Died: 24 March 1986 (aged 88); Wooster, Ohio, United States
- Education: Saint Sava's Seminary; University of Belgrade; University of Berlin
- Occupations: Theologian; Writer; Serbian Orthodox priest
- Notable work: Tri srpska velikana (1975)
- Movement: Yugoslav National Movement (Zbor)

Dimitrije Najdanović (Serbian Cyrillic: Димитрије Најдановић; 7 June 1897 – 24 March 1986) was a Serbian theologian, writer, and Serbian Orthodox priest. Educated in philosophy and theology at the University of Belgrade and the University of Berlin, he was active in interwar intellectual life and a member of the far-right Yugoslav National Movement (Zbor). Najdanović founded and edited several theological and cultural journals, including Svetosavlje, Put, and Hrišćanske misli, and taught theology in Belgrade before and during World War II.

During the Axis occupation of Serbia, he worked at the Ministry of Education of the collaborationist Government of National Salvation and later served as an associate professor at Belgrade's Faculty of Theology. After the war he lived in exile in Austria, Italy, and England, where he was dean of a Serbian Orthodox theological school at Dorchester on Thames and a parish priest in Derby. Najdanović later ministered to Serbian Orthodox communities in Montreal and the United States. His writings, notably Tri srpska velikana, explored the philosophical and spiritual legacy of Đura Jakšić, Petar II Petrović-Njegoš, and Bishop Nikolaj Velimirović.

== Life ==
=== Early life ===
Dimitrije Najdanović was born on 7 June 1897 in Kragujevac, Serbia. He was raised in a middle-class family. His mother was a devout Serbian Orthodox Christian and his father was a schoolteacher. He attended grammar school in Kragujevac and later the gymnasium in Belgrade, where he developed an interest in Plato.

As tensions escalated between Austria-Hungary and the Kingdom of Serbia, Najdanović contributed to relief work and undertook civilian preparation. After turning seventeen in June 1914, he entered an officers' training program and served in World War I. He fought on the Eastern Front, took part in the Great Retreat, and served on the Salonika front until the end of the war in 1918.

=== Interwar work ===
Najdanović graduated from Saint Sava's Seminary in 1935. He studied philosophy and theology at the University of Belgrade from 1935 to 1938. In 1935 he joined the Yugoslav National Movement (Zbor) at the behest of his mentor Veselin Čajkanović.

He later pursued postgraduate studies in philosophy and theology at the University of Berlin. There he attended lectures by Nicolai Hartmann and Eduard Spranger. His doctoral thesis was titled Die Geschichtsphilosophie Immanuel Hermann Fichtes (The philosophy of history of Immanuel Hermann Fichte).

In the interwar period, Najdanović founded three magazines and journals: Svetosavlje (Saintsavaism), Put (Path), and Hrišćanske misli (Christian thoughts). In Belgrade he worked as a theology teacher at the 4th Boys' Real Gymnasium. He also taught classes connected with Čajkanović at the Faculty of Philosophy of the University of Belgrade. His opposition to the proposed concordat with the Vatican led to a government ban.

=== World War II and exile ===
During the Axis occupation of Serbia, Najdanović worked at the Ministry of Education of the collaborationist Government of National Salvation from 3 November 1941. On 25 January 1943 he was appointed an associate professor at Belgrade's Faculty of Theology, where he taught history of philosophy.

In late 1944, before the Belgrade offensive, he resigned his post at the faculty and, with his wife Jelena (née Filipović), left Serbia for Austria. There, they stayed at the displaced-persons camp at Lienz. After the end of hostilities in 1945, they left Austria for Rome via Linz, where Najdanović published Serbian Orthodox liturgical textbooks using a Vatican printer.

=== England ===
In 1947, Najdanović and his wife moved to England. They were recommended by Serbian Patriarch Gavrilo V to Harold Buxton, the Bishop of Gibraltar in Europe. On their arrival in London, Buxton and Arthur Foster of the World Council of Churches Service to Refugees met a group of 40 Serbian students and clergy at Victoria Station and accompanied them to Dorchester on Thames where a theological training school had been established in the Old College building of Dorchester College.

Patriarch Gavrilo appointed Najdanović dean of the faculty, and Foster served as bursar at the college. As dean, Najdanović taught dogmatics, religion, Christian apologetics and ethics.

His Serbian students were referred to as the "Dorchester Boys". Many later emigrated to the United States and elsewhere and served in Serbian Orthodox institutions in North America, including Milan Savich in Chicago, Veselin Kesich at Saint Vladimir's Orthodox Theological Seminary, and Irinej Kovačević of the Serbian Orthodox Eparchy of New Gračanica and Midwestern America.

Najdanović also served as a Serbian Orthodox parish priest in Derby from 1948 to 1960, when he emigrated to Montreal, Quebec.

=== Canada ===
Shortly after arriving in Montreal, Najdanović encouraged his parishioners to purchase a building and property in the center of Montreal at 4259 de Bullion Street. The second floor was adapted for a chapel and an apartment, while the ground floor was turned into a hall and fellowship room.

Commissions for the iconostasis and icons were given to master woodcarver Vladimir Barac and artist José Majzner, respectively. Repair work on the Holy Trinity Serbian Orthodox Church was completed in 1961. The consecration took place on 6 September 1964, officiated by Bishop Stefan Lastavica of the Eastern American Diocese.

=== United States and death ===
In 1967 Najdanović and Jelena moved to the United States, where he served as a priest in New York City and Phoenix, Arizona before retiring at the Glendora Health Care Center in Wooster, Ohio. He died on 24 March 1986, aged 88.

== Work ==
Najdanović wrote on theology, philosophy, and Serbian literary history. His 1975 book Tri srpska velikana (Three Serbian giants) discusses the literary and intellectual legacy of Đura Jakšić, Petar II Petrović-Njegoš and Bishop Nikolaj Velimirović. In a 1976 review in Books Abroad, Mateja Matejić described Tri srpska velikana as combining literary criticism with philosophical reflection and commented favorably on Najdanović's style and approach.

Najdanović's theological views were greatly influenced by Nikolaj Velimirović.

== See also ==
- Djoko Slijepčević
- Lazo M. Kostić
- Velibor Jonić
- Dimitrije Ljotić
- Ratko Parežanin
