= Vrnčani =

Vrnčani may refer to the following places in Serbia:

- Vrnčani (Čačak), village in the municipality of Čačak
- Vrnčani (Gornji Milanovac), village in the municipality of Gornji Milanovac
