= Ljuša =

Ljuša may refer to:

- Ljuša, Serbia, a village near Kuršumlija
- Ljuša, Bosnia and Herzegovina, a village near Šipovo and Donji Vakuf
