= Saints Constantine and Helen Serbian Orthodox Church =

Serbian Orthodox church in Galveston, Texas

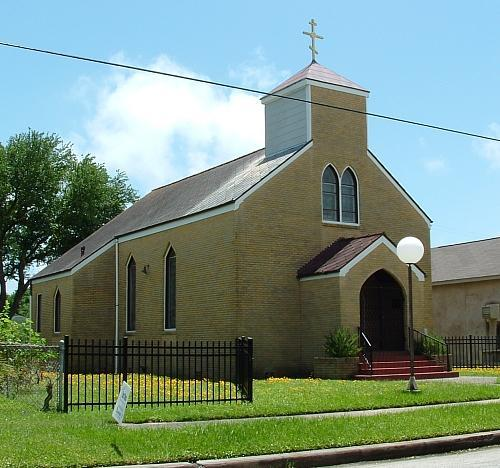
- Saints Constantine and Helen Serbian Orthodox Church, pictured in 2004
- Saints Constantine and Helen Serbian Orthodox Church
- 29.292503°N 94.812712°W
- Location: Galveston, Texas
- Country: United States
- Denomination: Eastern Orthodox

History
- Status: Parish church
- Founded: 1861 (parish founded)
- Consecrated: 3 June 1896

Architecture
- Groundbreaking: 1895
- Completed: 1896

Administration
- Diocese: Serbian Orthodox Eparchy of New Gračanica and Midwestern America
- Parish: Saints Constantine and Helen Parish

Clergy
- Bishop: Longin Krčo
- Priest: Father Srdjan Veselinovich

The Saints Constantine and Helen Serbian Orthodox Church (Serbian: Српска православна црква светих цара Константина и царице Јелене, romanized: Srpska pravoslavna crkva svetih cara Konstantina i carice Jelene) is an Eastern Orthodox Christian church located in Galveston, Texas. It is a parish of the Serbian Orthodox Eparchy of New Gračanica and Midwestern America of the Serbian Orthodox Church.

== History ==
The Eastern Orthodox community had existed in the port city of Galveston since 1861 as the parish of Saints Constantine and Helen. By the late 1800s a group of Serbs, Greeks, and Russians appealed to the Holy Synod of the Russian Orthodox Church in St. Petersburg, Russia, and Tsar Nicholas II for a church. The Tsar approved the establishment of a church and in 1895 construction began. The building was finished in 1896 and consecration took place on the feast day of Saint Constantine and Saint Helen. Tsar Nicholas II also personally donated icons for the Iconostasis, a gospel book, and a number of sacred vessels. The first priest assigned to the new church was Archimandrite Theoclitos Triantafilides. Services were originally held in Greek, Russian and Serbian; however, in 1933 the Greek members of the church voted to create a "daughter parish" of Sts. Constantine and Helen and operate it under the Greek Orthodox Church, naming their new church Assumption of the Virgin Mary Greek Orthodox Church.

Saints Constantine and Helen Serbian Orthodox Church was the first Serbian Orthodox church in the state and its parish is the oldest Orthodox parish in Texas. The church also holds the distinction of being the second oldest Serbian Orthodox church in the United States.

== Notable clergy ==
Galveston native, Metropolitan Bishop Christopher Kovacevich of the Metropolitanate of Libertyville-Chicago, was born and raised as a member of Saints Constantine and Helen Church. As an adult and Metropolitan, he would frequently return to the city and preside at church weddings and baptisms.

== Gallery ==
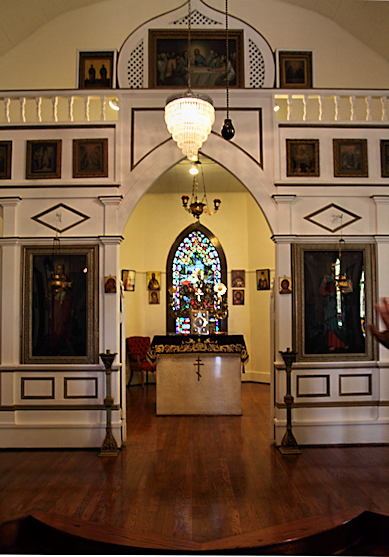
Church altar

== See also ==
- Serbian Orthodox Eparchy of New Gračanica and Midwestern America
- Serbian Orthodox Church in North and South America
- Serbian Americans

== Sources ==
- Vuković, Sava (1998). History of the Serbian Orthodox Church in America and Canada 1891–1941. Kragujevac: Kalenić.
