= Saint Sava Serbian Orthodox Church (Milwaukee) =

Serbian Orthodox church in Milwaukee, Wisconsin

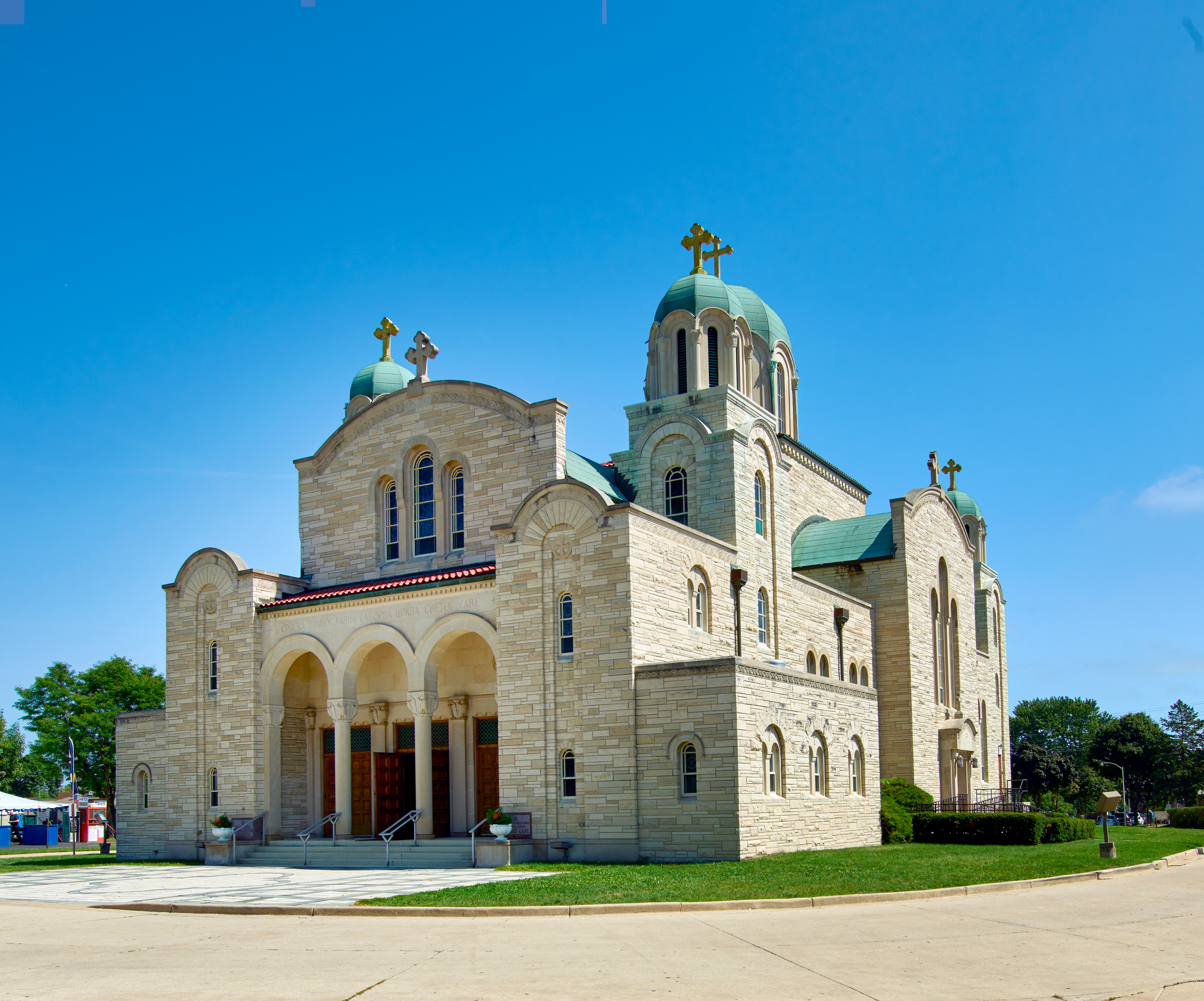
- Saint Sava Serbian Orthodox Church
- 42°59′11.8″N 87°58′43.3″W
- Location: 3201 S. 51st. Street; Milwaukee, Wisconsin
- Country: United States
- Denomination: Serbian Orthodox Church
- Website: www.stsava-milw.org

History
- Status: Parish church
- Dedication: Saint Sava
- Consecrated: 1956 (land); 1958 (building)

Architecture
- Functional status: Active
- Architect(s): Camburas and Theodore
- Style: Serbo-Byzantine architecture Byzantine Revival
- Completed: 1958

Specifications
- Materials: Stone

Administration
- Diocese: Serbian Orthodox Eparchy of New Gračanica and Midwestern America

The Saint Sava Serbian Orthodox Church (Serbian: Српска православна црква Светог Саве, romanized: Srpska pravoslavna crkva Svetog Save) is an Eastern Orthodox church located in Milwaukee, Wisconsin. It is under jurisdiction of the Serbian Orthodox Eparchy of New Gračanica and Midwestern America of the Serbian Orthodox Church and is dedicated to Saint Sava, the first Archbishop of the Serbian Orthodox Church.

The church is covered in traditional wall mosaics that have been described as, "some of the most extensive and elaborate church mosaics in the United States." The church sits on a complex that also includes a parochial school and an event center known as the American Serb Hall, an important stop for political candidates including a number of men who have gone on to become President of the United States.

== History ==
=== Early period ===
Initial Serbian immigration to Milwaukee began in the late 19th century and continued through the early 20th century, by 1912 there were roughly 2,500 Serb immigrants living in the city and that number quickly rose to 6,000 Serbs by 1916. Exact immigration statistics for this period are considered unreliable at best, as a number of Serbian immigrants were lumped into other ethnic groups who were also immigrating from the Austro-Hungarian Empire around the same period. On February 8, 1912, a group of Serbs met and determined that there was a need for a Serbian Orthodox Church in their community. The unified faith community founded their first church that same year at 724 S. 3rd St., and the first divine liturgy was held on Christmas, January 7, 1913. Between 1912 and 1942 the parish went through 12 priests, and organized an executive board to help keep the church community organized. The parish faced many hard times during these years, as a large number of men in the congregation returned to Europe to fight in the Balkan Wars and World War I.

In 1942 Milan Brkich was elected as the parish priest, a relatively young member of the clergy, he is credited with reinvigorating the community during the 1940s. Milan Brkich is noted for resettling displaced Serbs to Milwaukee, and the chain migration that ensued from these relocations caused the Serb population in Milwaukee to grow and the languages and customs of the community to remain strong into the 1950s.

=== Construction ===
In the late 1940s the congregation bought 14 acres on Milwaukee's Southwest side. The American Serb Hall was built on the land in 1950 and with its success, the church decided to build a new church building in 1951. A building fund was established and church members were asked to contribute $100 each for construction of the cathedral. On August 26, 1956, a groundbreaking ceremony was held and the land was consecrated by Bishop Dionisije at the celebration. Construction soon commenced on not just the church building, but the new parish house and the new parish school building as well. On February 4, 1958, the construction was completed and the new cathedral was consecrated in August of the same year.

=== Contemporary period ===
In the decades that followed the completion of the church, it hosted a number of important events in the greater church community. The church was the site of the consecration of Firmilian Ocokoljich as the bishop of the Diocese of New Gračanica – Midwestern America on August 1, 1963. A year later, long time parish priest Milan Brkich retired after having served the church for more than 20 years. The addition of a new cultural center in the 1970s, the subsequent renovations of the American Serb Hall and the completion of the cathedral's mosaics are other major achievements during the latter half of the 20th century. Today the cathedral remains an active community, and in 2012 the congregation celebrated their 100th anniversary.

== Architecture ==
St. Sava Serbian Orthodox Church was designed in the Serbo-Byzantine style. The interior of the cathedral is covered almost entirely with wall mosaics that cost more than US$3 million, and 35 years to complete. The mosaics were designed by Italian artist Sirio Tonelli, and depict a number of important Orthodox Christian figures in the Byzantine iconographic style. The mosaics have been described as, "some of the most extensive and elaborate church mosaics in the United States." by the Milwaukee Journal Sentinel.

== American Serb Hall ==
Located adjacent to the cathedral property is the American Serb Hall, opened and consecrated in 1950. The hall was dedicated to Serbs who had given their lives defending the United States. The hall is home to a fish fry (including dine-in and drive thru service) that is claimed to be "America's Largest Good Friday Fish Fry"; on average the hall handles 440 fish orders per hour on that day every year. The American Serb Hall has also been an important campaign stop for many political candidates, including former presidents Ronald Reagan and Bill Clinton during their presidential campaigns.

In January 2021, the congregation announced that it would sell the American Serb Hall due to the financial losses caused by the fallout from the COVID-19 pandemic.

== See also ==
- St. Sava Orthodox School
- Serbian Orthodox Eparchy of New Gračanica and Midwestern America
- Serbian Orthodox Church in North and South America
- Serbian Americans
