= Saint Mark Serbian Orthodox Monastery =

Serbian Orthodox monastery in Sheffield, Ohio

Coordinates: 41°28′17.1″N 82°06′51.5″W

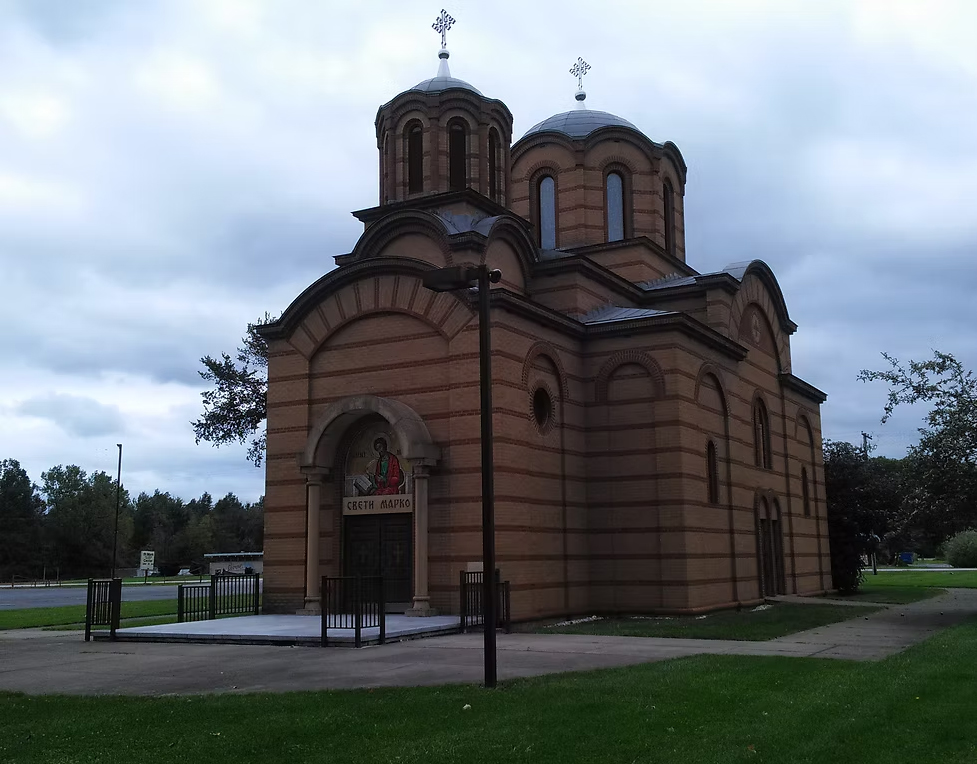
Monastery church

Saint Mark Serbian Orthodox Monastery (Serbian: Српски православни манастир Светог Марка, romanized: Srpski pravoslavni manastir Svetog Marka) is an Eastern Orthodox Christian monastery located in Sheffield, Ohio. It is under the omophorion of Bishop Irinej of the Serbian Orthodox Eparchy of Eastern America of the Serbian Orthodox Church. The monastery church was initially modelled after the medieval Marko's Monastery in Skopje, North Macedonia. Located just west of the monastery church is the Saint Mark Church Cemetery. The patronal feast day of the monastery is 8 May (Julian calendar).

Saint Mark Serbian Orthodox Monastery is listed as one of the important American Orthodox monasteries. In 1985, a youth camp opened at the monastery, which still continues with summer and winter activities.

== See also ==
- Serbian Orthodox Church in North and South America
- List of Serbian Orthodox monasteries
- List of Eastern Orthodox monasteries in the United States
