= Veselin Kesich =

Veselin Kesich (Serbian: Веселин Кесић, romanized: Veselin Kesić; Banja Luka, 12 March 1921 – Portland, 26 June 2012) was an Eastern Orthodox theologian, and university professor. He succeeded Alexander Schmemann as dean of the Saint Vladimir's Orthodox Theological Seminary in 1983.

== Biography ==
Veselin Kesich completed his elementary and secondary schooling in Banja Luka and started studies at the University of Belgrade. In 1941 he left the university to join the army to fight the invading forces of Nazi Germany. When General Milan Nedić was entrusted with the administration of German-occupied Serbia, Kesich remained under the command of Nedić in the government called the Government of National Salvation. When the Nazis were driven out of Yugoslavia by the Allies who allowed Tito and his communists to usurp the Old Order, all the loyal Serbs who fought the invader, succumbed to his wrath, endured four years of humiliation and survived the Yugoslav civil war, decided to leave the country en masse, with many ending in different displaced persons camps in post-World War II Europe. Kesich was sent to one of the most crowded camps at Eboli, near Salerno, wherein 1947 he had the good fortune to be selected to study theology at Dorchester College in England with 40 other students and priests who were at the camp when Bishop of Gibraltar in Europe, the Right Reverend Harold Buxton paid a visit.

In 1949, Kesich emigrated to the United States, where he resumed his studies, first at Columbia University, then St. Vladimir's Orthodox Theological Seminary, and the Union Theological Seminary. He received his Ph.D. in 1959 from Columbia University in New York City.

In 1957 Veselin Kesich married Lydia Weston (1928-2006) who taught Russian language and culture at Saint Vladimir's Seminary for many years.

Kesich was a long-standing member (1953-1991) of the Faculty of St. Vladimir's Orthodox Theological Seminary, specializing in the New Testament and also teaching courses in the areas of theology and spirituality. His many academic appointments include Faculty Member, Comparative Religion, Sarah Lawrence College (1966-1986); Adjunct Professor, Serbo–Croatian Literature, New York University (1965-1974); Visiting Associate Professor, Department of Slavic Languages, University of California, Berkeley (1962-1963); and Visiting Faculty, Comparative Religion, Hofstra University (1959-1963). After retirement, he was a guest lecturer abroad, including the Aristotle University of Thessaloniki in 1991 and at Wells-next-the-Sea, Norfolk, England in 1998.

== Works ==
- Formation and Struggles: The Birth of the Church AD 33-200 (2007)
- The Treasures of the Holy Land, co-authored with Lydia W. Kesich (1985)
- The Gospel Image of Christ: The Church and Modern Criticism (1972 and 1991)
- The First Day of the New Creation (1982)
- The Passion of Christ (1964 and 2004)

== See also ==
- Dimitrije Najdanović
