= Trinity Chapel Complex =

Serbian Orthodox church in Manhattan, New York

Saint Sava Serbian Orthodox Church
- Trinity Chapel Complex
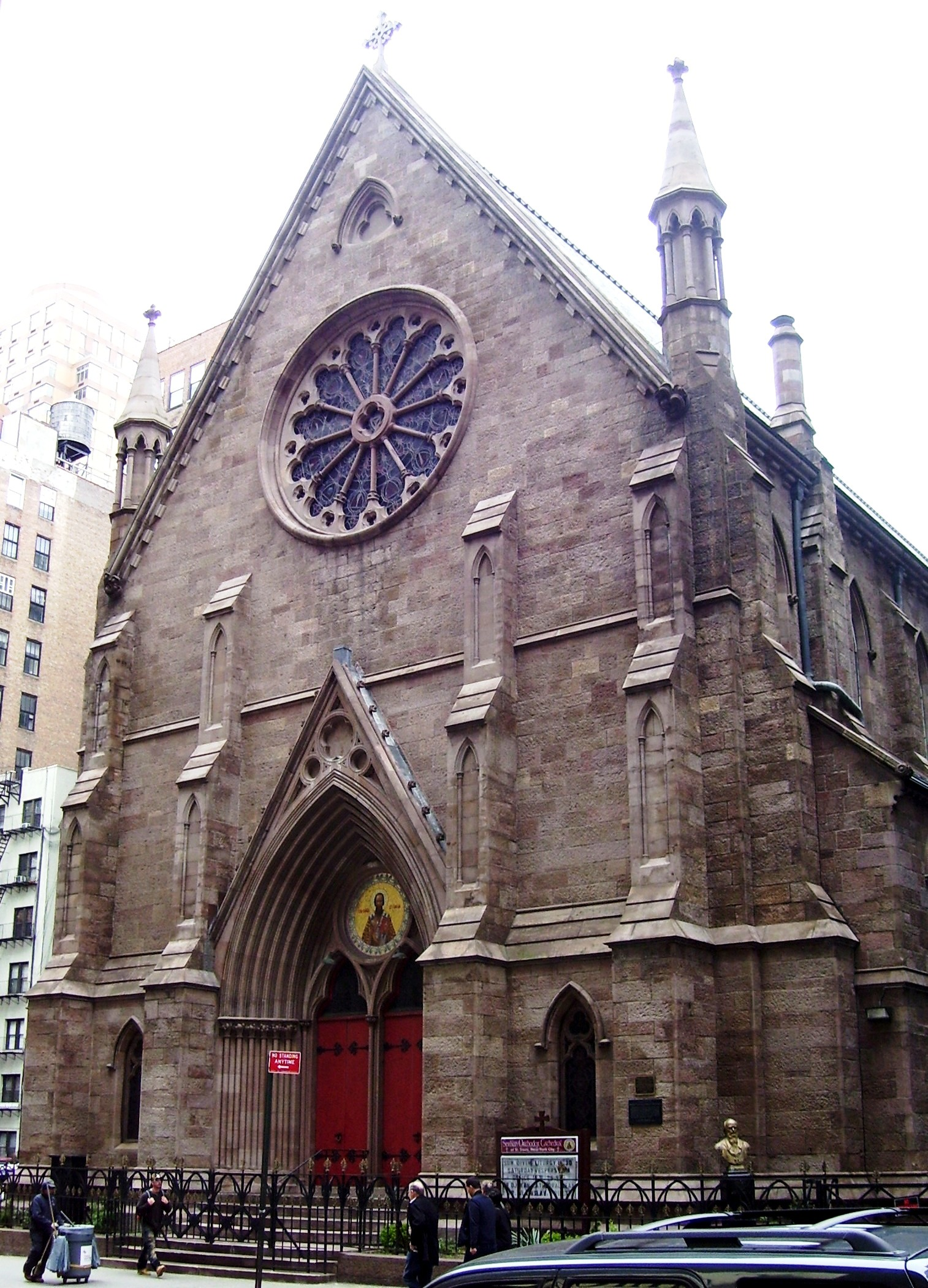

- Location within Manhattan Location within New York City Location within New York Location within the United States
- 40°44′37″N 73°59′24″W
- Location: 15 West 25th St. Manhattan, New York City
- Country: United States
- Denomination: Serbian Orthodox Church
- Previous denomination: Episcopal Church
- Website: stsavanyc.org

History
- Former name: Trinity Chapel
- Status: Parish church

Architecture
- Functional status: Temporarily closed
- Architect(s): sanctuary: Richard Upjohn parish school: Jacob Wrey Mould clergy house: Richard Upjohn & Richard M. Upjohn reredos & altar: Frederick Clarke Withers
- Style: Gothic Revival
- Years built: sanctuary: 1850–55 parish school: 1860 clergy house: 1866

Administration
- Diocese: Serbian Orthodox Eparchy of Eastern America
- Trinity Chapel Complex
- U.S. National Register of Historic Places
- New York State Register of Historic Places
- New York City Landmark
- NRHP reference No.: 82001205
- NYSRHP No.: 06101.000643
- NYCL No.: 0233

Significant dates
- Added to NRHP: December 16, 1982
- Designated NYSRHP: October 29, 1982
- Designated NYCL: April 18, 1968

The Trinity Chapel Complex, now known as the Saint Sava Serbian Orthodox Church (Serbian: Српска православна црква Светог Саве, romanized: Srpska pravoslavna crkva Svetog Save) is a historic Eastern Orthodox church located at 15 West 25th Street between Broadway and the Avenue of the Americas (6th Avenue) in the NoMad neighborhood of Manhattan, New York City. It is under jurisdiction of the Serbian Orthodox Eparchy of Eastern America of the Serbian Orthodox Church and is dedicated to Saint Sava, the first Archbishop of the Serbian Orthodox Church.

The church building was constructed in 1850–55 and was designed by architect Richard Upjohn in English Gothic Revival style. It was built as one of several uptown chapels of the Trinity Church parish, but was sold to the Serbian Orthodox parish in 1942, re-opening as the Saint Sava Serbian Orthodox Church in 1944.

The church complex includes the Trinity Chapel School, now the church's Parish House, which was built in 1860 and was designed by Jacob Wrey Mould, a polychromatic Victorian Gothic building which is Mould's only extant structure in New York City. Attached to the sanctuary itself is the Clergy House at 26 West 26th Street, which was built in 1866 and was designed by Richard Upjohn and his son Richard M. Upjohn.

The chapel was designated a New York City landmark in 1968, and the complex was added to the National Register of Historic Places in 1982.

Most of the church was destroyed in a four-alarm fire on May 1, 2016. As of 2023, reconstruction had advanced enough for a liturgy to be held within the shell of the partially rebuilt church.

== History ==
=== Trinity Chapel ===
With the population of New York City moving ever-northward up Manhattan Island in the mid-19th century, Trinity Church, the center of Episcopalianism in the city, needed to provide for its uptown parishioners, especially in the increasingly sought-after residential neighborhoods around Union and Madison Squares. The church's solution was to build a chapel, named Trinity Chapel, on West 25th Street just off of Madison Square as an uptown annex. The architect selected was Richard Upjohn, who designed the third and current version of Trinity Church, as well as the Church of the Ascension on Fifth Avenue and West 10th Street, as well as many other churches in the Gothic Revival mode in the northeast.

The parish was a wealthy and influential one, and Trinity was the only one of Trinity Church's chapels which was capable of supporting itself without assistance from the home church. In 1865 in Trinity Episcopal Church the Orthodox Liturgy was held for the first time in American history. Among the congregants was writer Edith Wharton, who was married in the church in 1885. In 1892, the reredos and altar were redesigned by Frederick Clarke Withers.

By 1930, as the rich and influential continued their uptown migration, the neighborhood around Madison Square had seriously declined. The chapel was now located within the Tenderloin, the city's main entertainment and red light district, and the congregation had dwindled.

=== Saint Sava Church ===
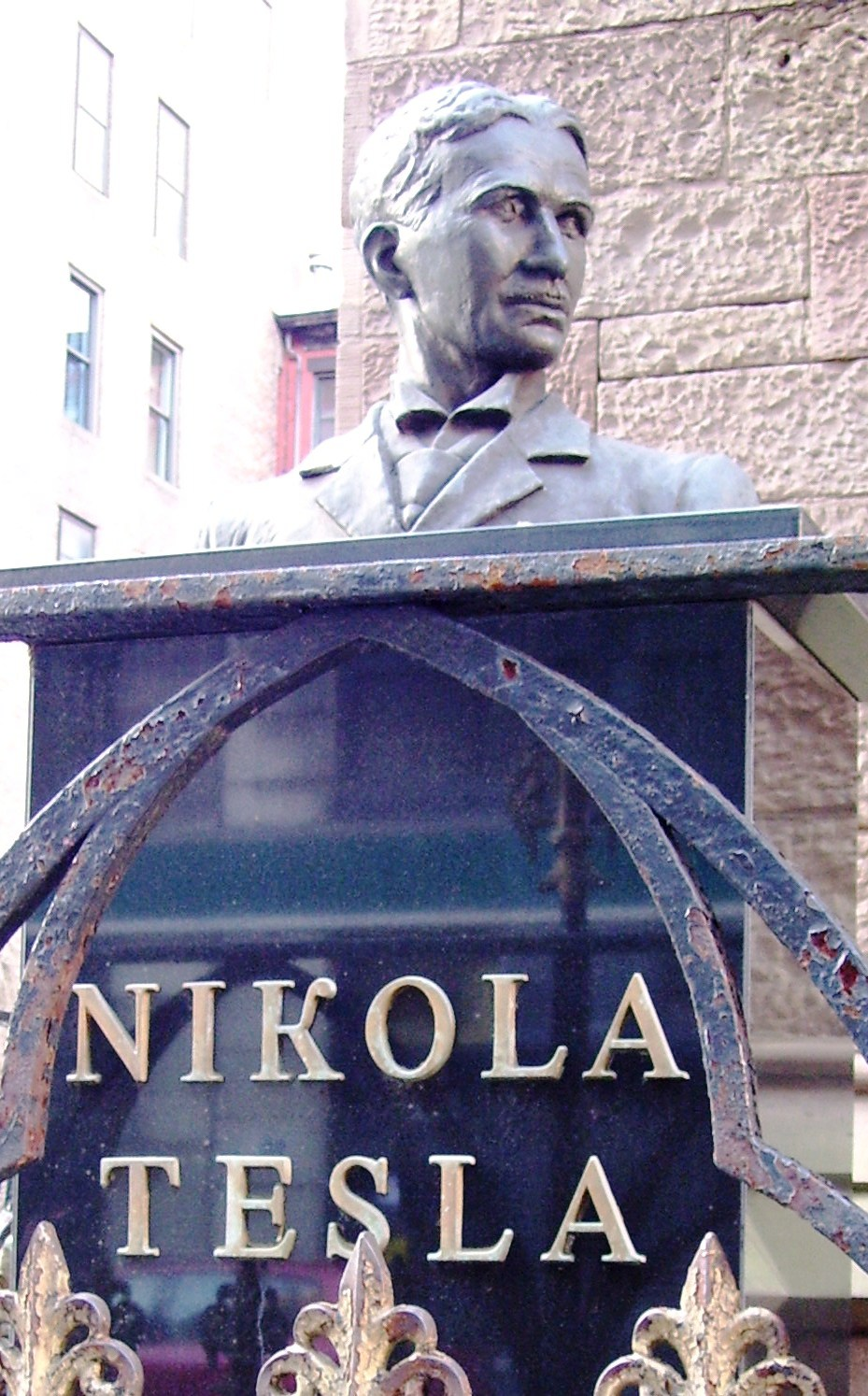
Bust of Nikola Tesla outside the church

A Serbian Orthodox congregation, founded in the 1930s, purchased the building in 1942, with assistance from various Serbian churches, and the building re-opened in 1944 as a Serbian Orthodox church dedicated to Saint Sava, the traditional patron saint of the Serbs. The first pastor was Rev. Dushan Shoulkletovich. Peter II, the last king of Yugoslavia, attended services here.

Gradual changes were made to the sanctuary to make it more Eastern Orthodox in style. A hand-carved oak iconostasis was added in 1962. The Byzantine, hand-carved iconostasis, brought from the Monastery of Saint Naum in Ohrid, then-Yugoslavia, was placed in the church and blessed.

The icons on the iconostasis were written by Russian iconographer, Ivan Meljinkov.

When a bomb went off near the church on September 4, 1966 destroying some of the stained glass, they were replaced with new ones commissioned in Byzantine style.

Serbian Orthodox Patriarch Pavle visited Saint Sava Church in 1992. This was the first time the New York church community was visited by a Patriarch.

Outside the church are busts of Bishop Nikolaj Velimirović, who was instrumental in founding the parish, helped to organize the Serbian Orthodox Church in America, and was in later years the "luminary-in-residence" at the church; Nikola Tesla, the inventor; and Michael Pupin, a physicist.

Prior to the fire of May 1, 2016 around $4 million had been spent on renovations to the church's roof, gutters, and its attached community center. The church's ceiling was repainted during those renovations to depict a nighttime sky.

=== 2016 fire and rebuilding ===
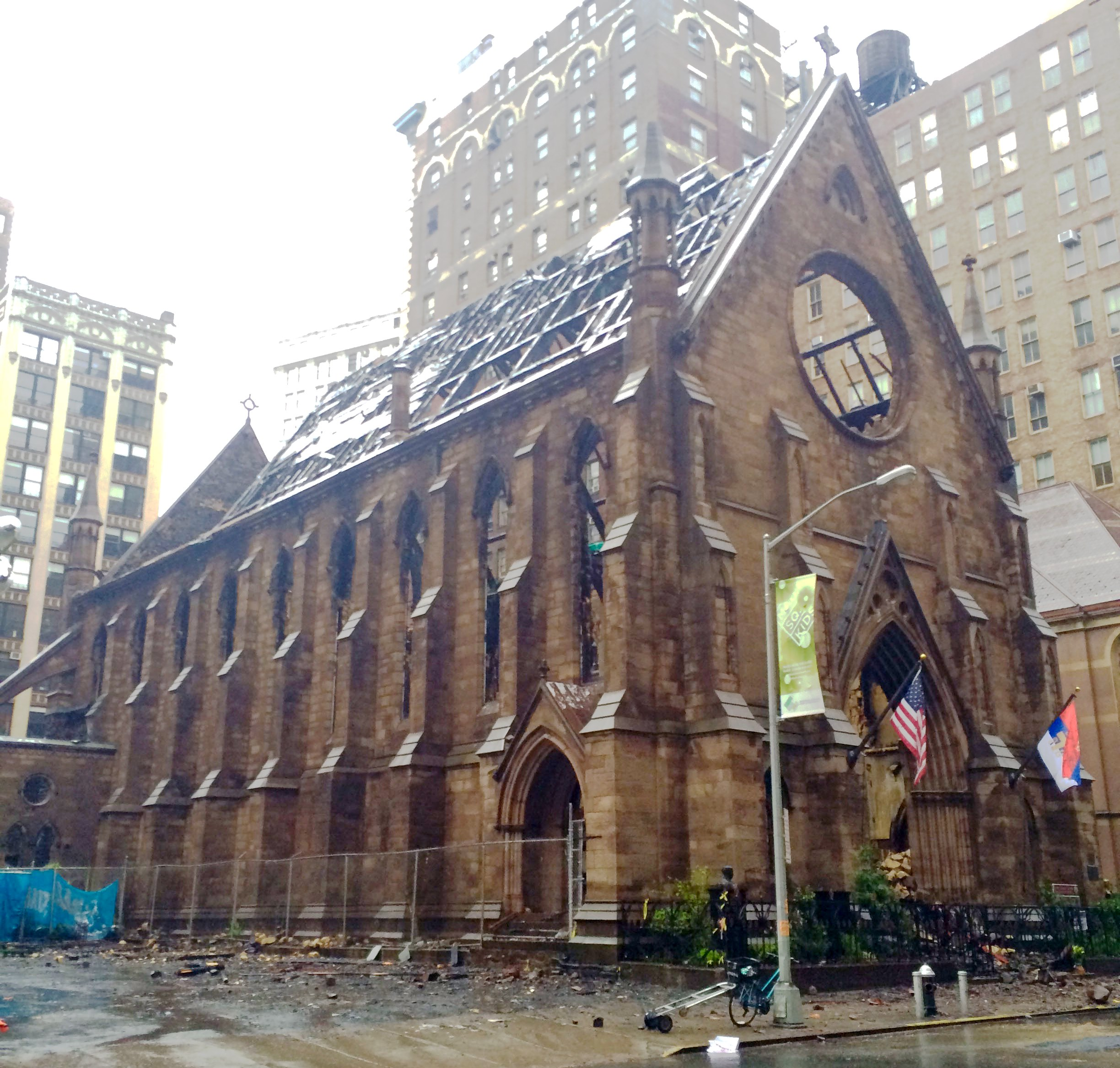
The church after the fire.

On May 1, 2016, a massive fire occurred at the church, on the day Orthodox Christians were celebrating Easter, destroying most of the building. The four-alarm fire started at 6:49 p.m. local time and was brought under control by 8:30 p.m. More than 170 firefighters overall were involved.

There was one minor injury.

The stone walls of the cathedral remain standing, and have been deemed to be structurally sound and not currently in danger of collapsing. Church officials have indicated they will examine whether any part of the structure could be preserved.

The parish house associated with the Saint Sava Church was not harmed by fire.

In 2016 reports were circulating that the city of New York ordered that the remains of the structure be demolished, stating that the walls are too unstable to be allowed to stand. The Buildings Department quickly clarified that the inspection was not complete and they had not ordered the immediate demolition of the building and instead is working with the parish to stabilize the structure.

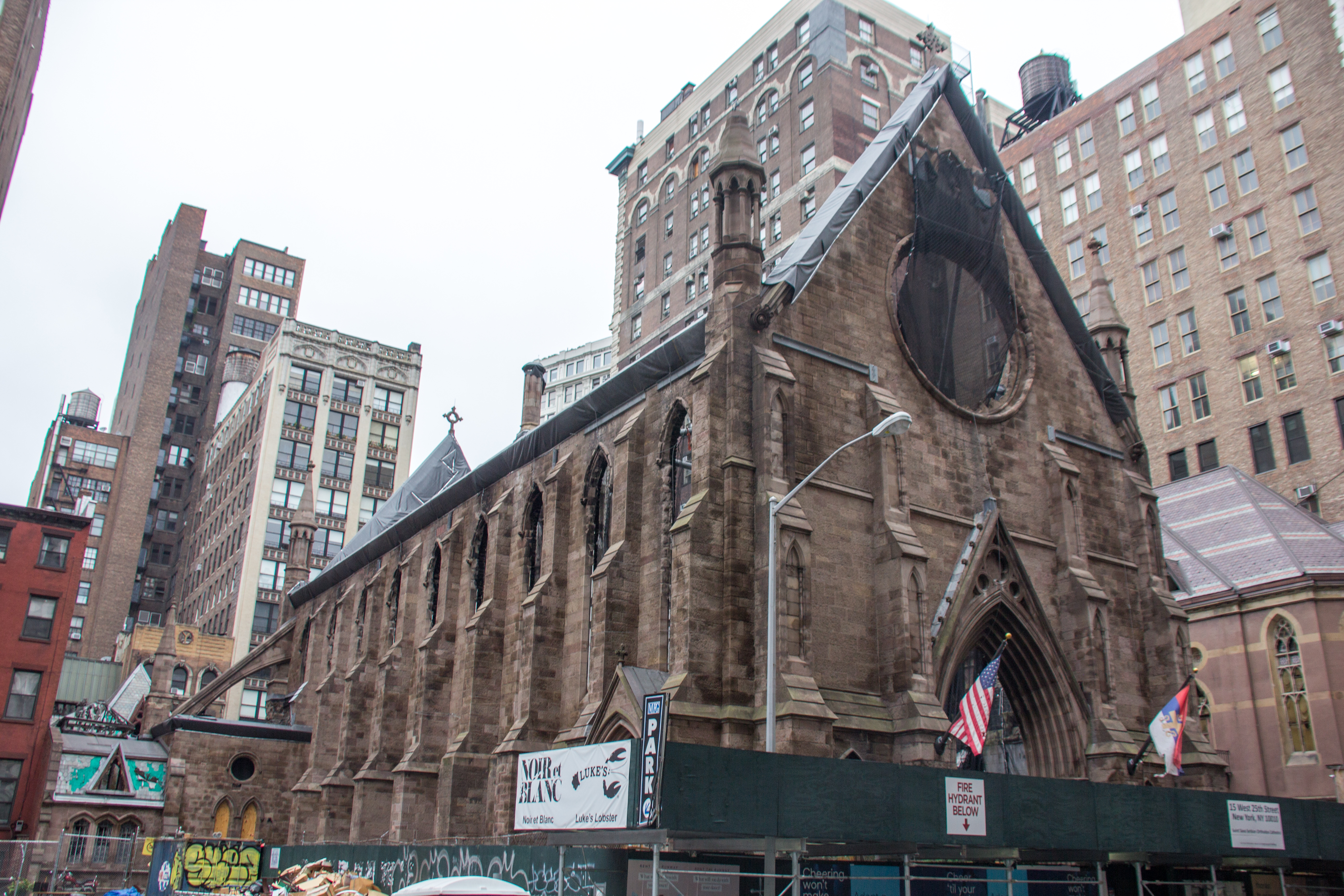
The church in 2017

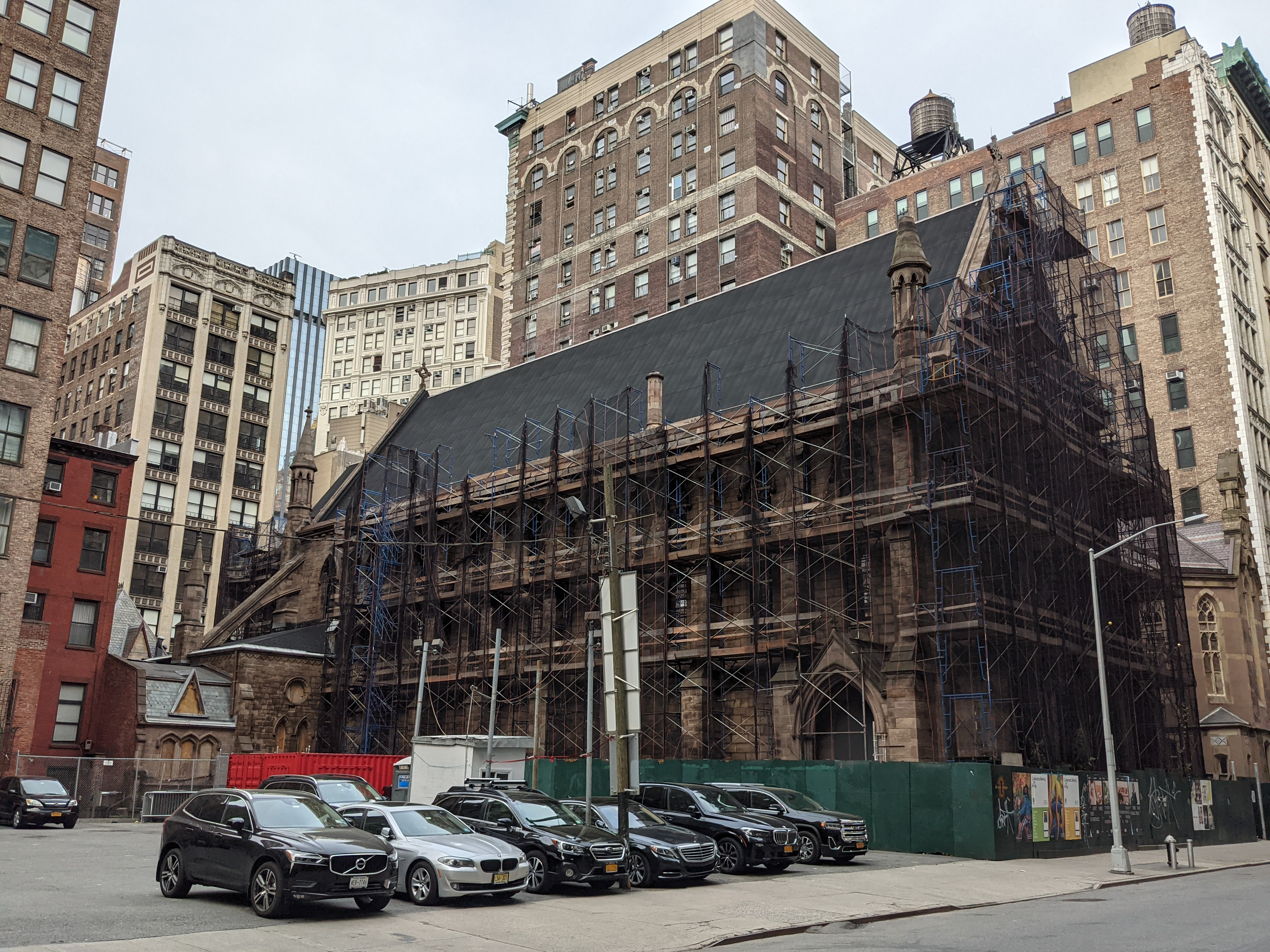
Reconstruction in 2021

Saint Sava parishioners reunited a few blocks away the first Sunday after the fire at Gramercy Park's Episcopal Calvary-St. George's Parish Church to worship.

Church officials indicated there will be plans to rebuild at the current site. Offers of support, including a letter from Patriarch Bartholomew, have been shared with the parishioners of the church.

Serbia's Foreign Minister Ivica Dačić indicated that the City of New York would be asked through diplomatic channels to aid in the rebuilding of the church. He also indicated Prime Minister Aleksandar Vučić authorized him to say that the government will help rebuild the church, "because it has great significance for the Serbian community and the Serbian spirit in New York."

As of two days after the fire, the definitive cause of the fire had not been determined. Candles that had not been properly extinguished after an Easter service were identified as a likely cause, according to a spokesperson of the New York City Fire Department (FDNY). A caretaker told fire marshals that he stowed the candles in a cardboard box under a piece of wooden furniture in a rear corner of the 161-year-old church.

Nearly a month after the fire FDNY spokesman Frank Gribbon indicated conclusively that, "Fire marshals have ... determined that candles, which had not been completely extinguished, caused the fire." It was reported that the city has ordered the remains of the church demolished, calling them unstable. The Buildings Department quickly clarified that the inspection was not complete and they had not ordered the immediate demolition of the building. In August 2016 city Building Department ordered that metal beams be used to shore up the walls and the building be covered with a waterproof canvas to keep it from being damaged further by the elements; this was completed in September 2016.

In May 2018 the parish filed a lawsuit against their insurer Church Mutual for US$47M. The insurer's payment was US$12.7M based on the 1945 purchase price and subsequent improvements. The church countered that the payment did not account for present day rebuilding costs, which the church said were US$60M. The parish and the insurer reached an undisclosed settlement in April 2019. Installation of the new roof over the nave was completed in July 2019. As of November 2019 steel I-beams for the new floor were being installed as well as framing for the windows which will be fitted with temporary acrylic panels. An image captured in March 2020 showed that the building had been enclosed.

On February 7, 2023 the first Divine Liturgy since the fire was held within the shell of the partially rebuilt church.

== Architecture ==
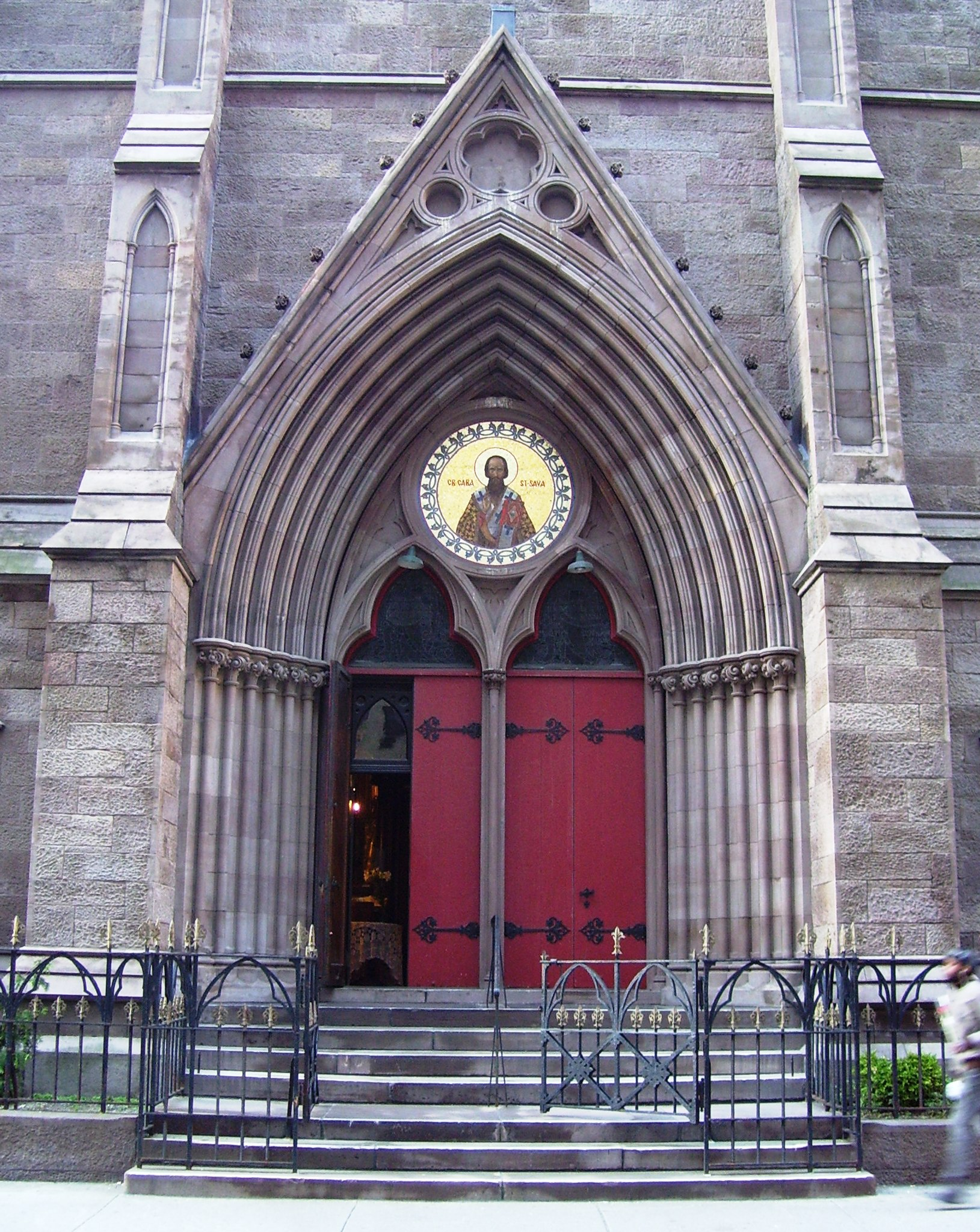
The entrance

The exterior is made of heavy blocks of sandstone etched in a rough finish, accented with austere Gothic trim and details. The front façade sits on West 25th Street and faces south. It measures around 65 feet (20 m) in width by roughly 100 feet (30 m) in height. The façade is supported by four stone buttresses, framed by delicate stone turrets at the sides, and punctuated by a large rose window above the entrance.

Prior to the 2016 fire, the church was known to have had one of the largest timber hammerbeam roofs in New York City.

== See also ==
- Serbian Orthodox Eparchy of Eastern America
- Serbian Orthodox Church in North and South America
- Serbian Americans
