= St. Sava Orthodox School =

Coordinates: 42°59′09.8″N 87°58′44.8″W

- Milwaukee, Wisconsin, United States

Information
- Type: Private
- Established: 1997
- Enrollment: 95 students

St. Sava Orthodox School is a Serbian-American private school located in Milwaukee, Wisconsin, United States. The school offers a preschool and schooling for children in pre-kindergarten to the 8th grade. The school works in tandem with the Serbian Orthodox Church, and seeks to promote bilingual education and cultural growth to the city's Serbian community. Lessons are taught in both the Serbian and English languages.

The school was established in 1997, making it the oldest daily Serbian school in the United States.

Students at St. Sava Orthodox School are encouraged to take advantage of the extracurricular activities available. Some of them include: academic competitions, athletics, and folklore.

== See also ==
- Saint Sava Serbian Orthodox Church
- St. Sava Academy
