= Ljuša, Bosnia and Herzegovina =

Ljuša Љуша
- Village
- Interactive map of Ljuša
- Location within Bosnia and Herzegovina
- Coordinates: 44°12′N 17°15′E
- Country: Bosnia and Herzegovina
- Entity: Republika Srpska; Federation of Bosnia and Herzegovina
- Canton: Central Bosnia
- Municipality: Šipovo; Donji Vakuf

Area
  - Total: 15.07 sq mi (39.03 km^{2})

Population (2013)
  - Total: 14
  - Density: 0.93/sq mi (0.36/km^{2})
- Time zone: UTC+1 (CET)
  - Summer (DST): UTC+2 (CEST)
- Area code: 50

Ljuša (Serbian Cyrillic: Љуша) is a small village located partly in the town of Šipovo in Republika Srpska and partly in the municipality of Donji Vakuf, Bosnia and Herzegovina.

== Demographics ==
According to the 2013 census, its population was 14, all Serbs in the Šipovo part with none living in the Donji Vakuf part.

== Notable residents ==
- Mitrofan Kodić
