= New Gračanica Serbian Orthodox Monastery =

Serbian Orthodox monastery in Third Lake, Illinois

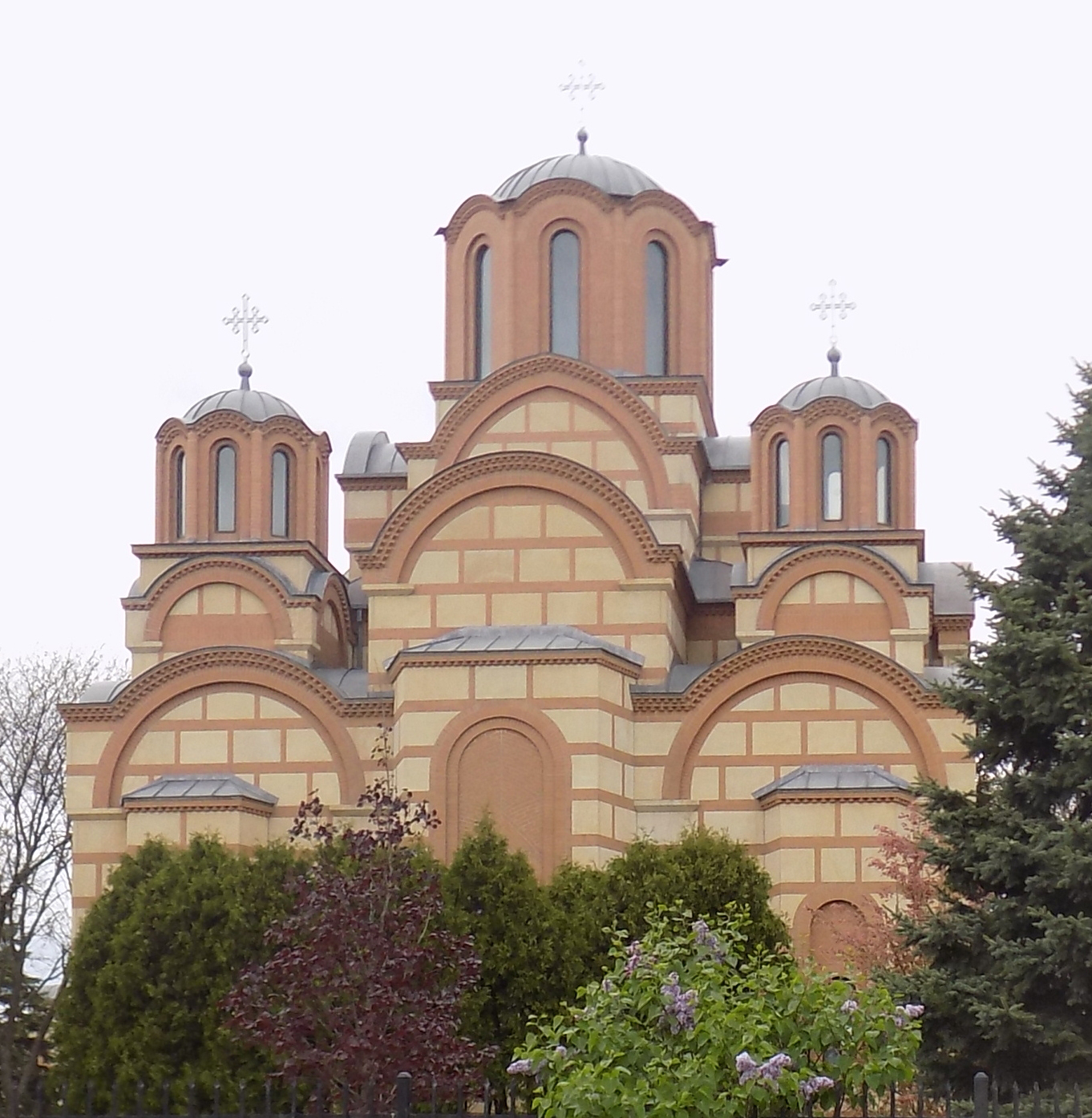
- Monastery church
- Interactive map of New Gračanica Serbian Orthodox Monastery

Monastery information
- Order: Serbian Orthodox Church
- Established: 1984
- Dedication: Protection of Theotokos
- Diocese: Serbian Orthodox Eparchy of New Gračanica and Midwestern America

Site
- Location: Third Lake, Illinois
- Coordinates: 42.374028°N 88.003972°W

New Gračanica Serbian Orthodox Monastery (Serbian: Српски православни манастир Нoва Грачаница, romanized: Srpski pravoslavni manastir Nova Gračanica) is an Eastern Orthodox Christian monastery located in Third Lake, Illinois, a suburb of Chicago. It is under jurisdiction of the Serbian Orthodox Eparchy of New Gračanica and Midwestern America of the Serbian Orthodox Church and serves as its headquarters. The monastery complex has 300 acres of land, making it the 6th largest monastery among the 80 American Orthodox Christian monasteries.

== History ==
Built on land that the Serbian Orthodox Church purchased in 1977, New Gračanica Church and the main building on its grounds dedicated to the feast of the Protection of Theotokos were completed and consecrated in 1984.

== Architecture ==
It is an architectural replica of the original Gračanica in Kosovo, listed as the World Heritage Site, but built in a scale eighteen percent larger than the original.

In 1995, famed Polish American artist Fr. Theodore Jurewicz was commissioned to paint the entire church. Done over the span of three years, Fr. Theodore is held to be one of the most celebrated icon painters in North America today. Painted in a Byzantine style it features richly colored designs and religious scenes covering the walls, vaults, pillars and dome of the church. The frescoes painted by Fr. Theodore like other contemporary icon painters are done in acrylics on dry plaster.

== See also ==
- Serbian Orthodox Church in North and South America
- List of Serbian Orthodox monasteries
- List of Eastern Orthodox monasteries in the United States
