= Rabrovac =

Coordinates: 44°21′N 20°45′E

- Village
- Interactive map of Rabrovac
- Country: Serbia
- Municipality: Mladenovac
- Time zone: UTC+1 (CET)
  - Summer (DST): UTC+2 (CEST)

Rabrovac (Serbian: Рабровац) is a village situated in Mladenovac municipality in Serbia.
