= Dorchester College =

Defunct theological college in Dorchester, England

Dorchester Missionary College, also known as the Dorchester College of St Peter and St Paul for Foreign Missions, was a theological college in Dorchester, Oxfordshire.

== History ==
Dorchester Missionary College, based in an eighteenth-century house extended for the purpose by George Gilbert Scott, was established in 1878 to train Anglican clergy to serve in the Church of England overseas. By 1903, the college was an associated theological college of Durham University. It closed in 1944 due to the recommendation by the Archbishops' commission to end missionary colleges.

The college was then turned into an Orthodox Theological College to serve the Serbian Orthodox Church in the diaspora on the initiative of the Bishop of Gibraltar in Europe, the Right Reverend Harold Buxton. After World War II, the Bishop of Gibraltar went to visit an overcrowded refugee camp in the town of Eboli near Salerno, where he was moved by the devotion of the internees who fought the German occupiers and Tito-led communists in Yugoslavia. There, General Miodrag Damjanović introduced Serbian theologian Dimitrije Najdanović to the Bishop of Gibraltar in Europe. In turn, Najdanović and Buxton discussed with 40 students and priests the possibility of forming a clergy training college in Dorchester, seeing that a nucleus was there.

The college served its missionary purpose until the 1960s. The building was later converted for residential use.

The Old College is a Grade II listed building.
