= Serbian Orthodox Eparchy of Eastern America =

Diocese of the Serbian Orthodox Church

Location
- Territory: Eastern United States
- Headquarters: New Rochelle, New York

Information
- Denomination: Eastern Orthodox
- Sui iuris church: Serbian Orthodox Church
- Established: 1983
- Cathedral: Holy Trinity Cathedral, Pittsburgh, Pennsylvania
- Language: Church Slavonic, Serbian, English

Current leadership
- Bishop: Irinej Dobrijević

Map

Website
- Serbian Orthodox Eparchy of Eastern America

The Serbian Orthodox Eparchy of Eastern America (Serbian: Српска православна епархија источноамеричка, romanized: Srpska pravoslavna eparhija istočnoamerička) is a diocese (eparchy) of the Serbian Orthodox Church, covering the eastern region of the United States.

== History ==
The Serbian Orthodox Eparchy of Eastern America was first created in 1983 by dividing the Serbian Orthodox Eparchy of Eastern America and Canada in two separate eparchies: Serbian Orthodox Eparchy of Eastern America and Serbian Orthodox Eparchy of Canada.

In 1991, by the decision of the Council of Bishops of the Serbian Orthodox Church jurisdiction on South America was ceded to this diocese. In South America and the Caribbean the Diocese of Eastern America had churches in Argentina, Brazil, Venezuela, Chile, Ecuador, Peru, and Dominican Republic.

In 2011, by the decision of the Council of Bishops of the Serbian Orthodox Church, parishes in South and Central America were allocated to the new Serbian Orthodox Eparchy of Buenos Aires and South America.

== Structure ==
The Serbian Orthodox Eparchy of Eastern America comprises 61 parishes: 15 in Ohio; 13 in Pennsylvania; 8 in Indiana; 6 in Florida; 5 in Michigan; three in New Jersey; two each in New York and North Carolina; and one each in Georgia, Massachusetts, Tennessee, Maryland (serving District of Columbia as well), Alabama, West Virginia, and Maine. The episcopal see is located at Holy Trinity Cathedral, Pittsburgh, Pennsylvania.

The diocese operates 53 churches and 7 monasteries, including:

- Holy Ascension Serbian Orthodox Monastery (Youngwood, Pennsylvania)
- Saint Mark Serbian Orthodox Monastery (Sheffield, Ohio)
- Saint Nikolaj Velimirović of Žiča Serbian Orthodox Monastery (China Township, Michigan)
- Saint Archangel Gabriel - New Marcha Serbian Orthodox Monastery (Richfield, Ohio)
- Most Holy Mother of God Serbian Orthodox Monastery (Springboro, Pennsylvania)
- Saint Xenia Metochion Serbian Orthodox Monastery (Indianapolis, Indiana)
- The Nativity of the Mother of God Serbian Orthodox Monastery (New Carlisle, Indiana)

== Gallery ==
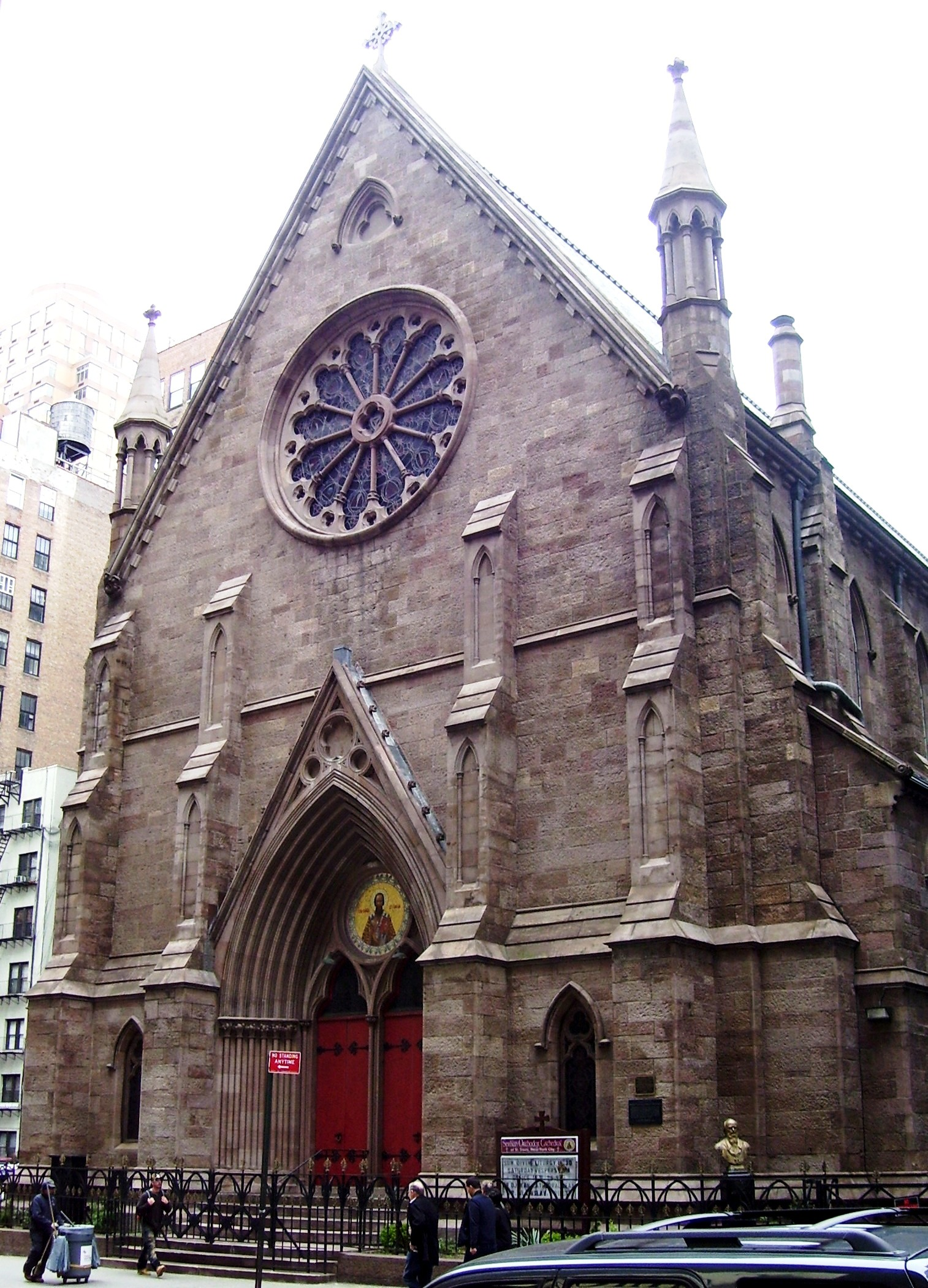
Saint Sava Church (Manhattan, New York)

Saint Sava Church (Merrillville, Indiana)

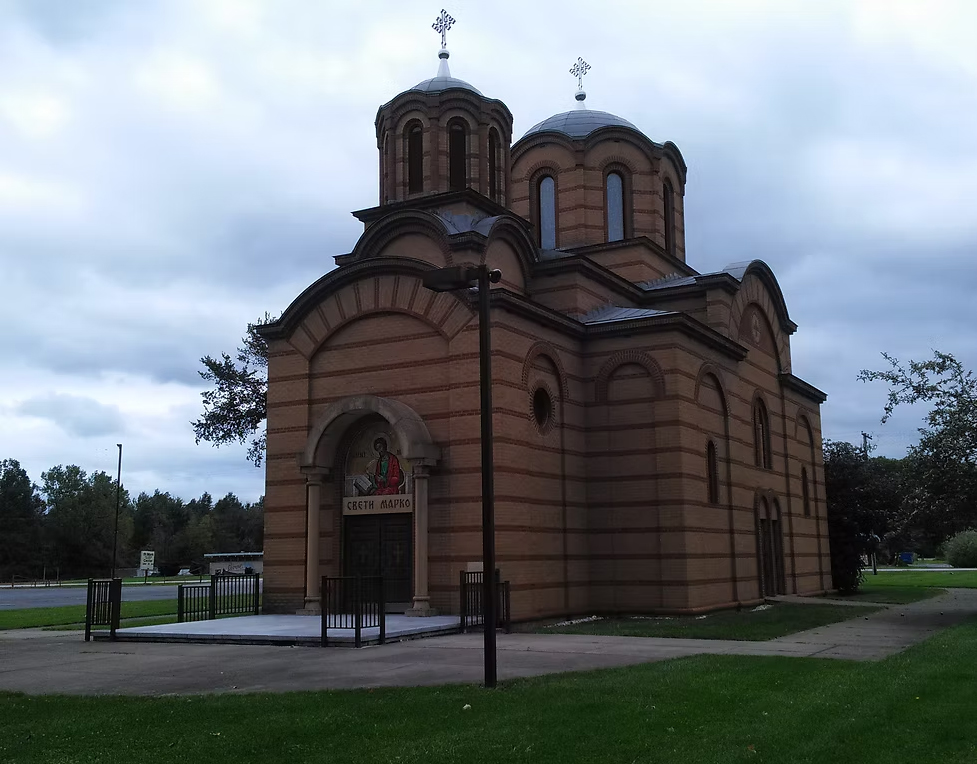
Saint Mark Monastery (Sheffield, Ohio)

== See also ==
- Serbian Orthodox Church in North and South America
- Eparchies and metropolitanates of the Serbian Orthodox Church
- Serbian Americans

== Sources ==
- Vuković, Sava (1998). History of the Serbian Orthodox Church in America and Canada 1891–1941. Kragujevac: Kalenić.
