= Saint Sava Serbian Orthodox Monastery and Seminary =

Serbian Orthodox monastery and seminary in Libertyville, Illinois

Saint Sava Serbian Orthodox Monastery
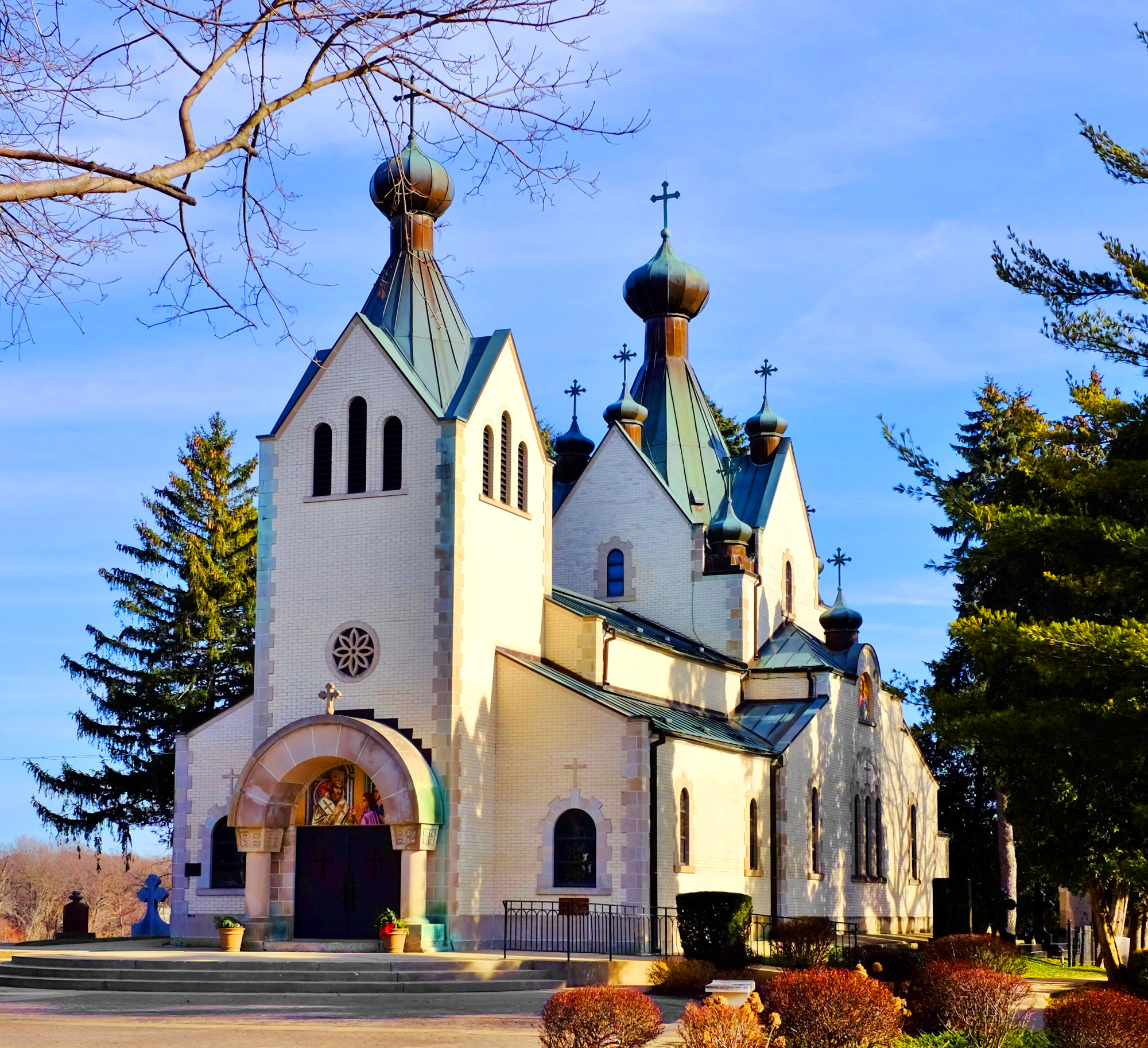
- Saint Sava Serbian Orthodox Monastery, pictured in 2015
- Interactive map of Saint Sava Serbian Orthodox Monastery

Monastery information
- Order: Serbian Orthodox Church
- Established: 1927
- Dedication: Saint Sava
- Diocese: Serbian Orthodox Eparchy of New Gračanica and Midwestern America

Site
- Location: Libertyville, Illinois

The Saint Sava Serbian Orthodox Monastery and Seminary (Serbian: Српски православни манастир Светог Саве, romanized: Srpski pravoslavni manastir Svetog Save) is an Eastern Orthodox Christian and professional school of theology located in Libertyville, Illinois. It is under jurisdiction of the Serbian Orthodox Eparchy of New Gračanica and Midwestern America of the Serbian Orthodox Church. The monastery is listed on the National Register of Historic Places.

== History ==
The monastery was founded in 1923 by Bishop Saint Mardarije as a Serbian Orthodox school.

Dionisije Milivojević was appointed the bishop of the American-Canadian Diocese in 1939. During World War II, the monastery became an American refuge for Serbs. In 1964, Patriarch German of the Serbian Orthodox Church defrocked American Bishop Dionisije Milivojević over political and administrative issues. This forced a split between the Serbian and North American branches of the church. The result was two separate North American churches — the Serbian Orthodox Church in the USA and Canada in Libertyville and the Diocese of New Gracanica – Midwestern America in nearby Third Lake. The Supreme Court of Illinois deemed that this schism was a violation of the mother church's regulations and ordered the recognition of Bishop Dionisije as head of the entire American-Canadian diocese. However, in 1976, the United States Supreme Court ruled that this decision violated the First and Fourteenth Amendment to the United States Constitution in Serbian Orthodox Diocese v. Milivojevich.

Peter II of Yugoslavia, the last Yugoslav king, lived at the monastery after being exiled by Yugoslav communist authorities headed by Josip Broz Tito. His will stipulated that he wished to be buried there. More than 10,000 people attended his funeral in 1970. He lay there until his remains were repatriated to Serbia in 2013.

== Saint Sava Serbian Orthodox Seminary ==
The Saint Sava Serbian Orthodox Seminary is a collocated facility with the monastery and possesses a library of 8,000 titles. Seminary education lasts five years. Students study Bible (Old Testament, New Testament), Bible history, history of the Christianity, church singing, catechism, apology of faith, Liturgy, patrology, dogmatics, Canon law, pedagogy, homily, history of religion with Sects, History of the Serbian Orthodox Church, philosophy, ethics with Asceticism, and computer science. In addition to Serbian, Church Slavonic is also studied.

== See also ==
- Serbian Orthodox Church in North and South America
- List of Serbian Orthodox monasteries
- List of Eastern Orthodox monasteries in the United States

== Sources ==
- Vuković, Sava (1998). History of the Serbian Orthodox Church in America and Canada 1891–1941. Kragujevac: Kalenić.

This article incorporates text from St. Sava's Serbian Orthodox Seminary (Libertyville, Illinois) at OrthodoxWiki which is licensed under the CC-BY-SA and GFDL.
