= Vrnčani (Gornji Milanovac) =

Vrnčani Врнчани
- Village
- Location within Serbia
- Coordinates: 44°04′21″N 20°22′25″E
- Country: Serbia
- District: Moravica District
- Municipality: Gornji Milanovac

Area
  - Total: 9.85 km^{2} (3.80 sq mi)

Population (2011)
  - Total: 330
  - Density: 34/km^{2} (87/sq mi)
- Time zone: UTC+1 (CET)
  - Summer (DST): UTC+2 (CEST)

Vrnčani is a village in the municipality of Gornji Milanovac, Serbia. According to the 2011 census, the village has a population of 330 people.
