= Serbian Orthodox Eparchy of New Gračanica and Midwestern America =

Diocese of the Serbian Orthodox Church

Location
- Territory: Midwestern United States
- Headquarters: New Gračanica Monastery, Third Lake, Illinois

Information
- Denomination: Eastern Orthodox
- Sui iuris church: Serbian Orthodox Church
- Established: 1963
- Cathedral: Cathedral of the Holy Resurrection, Chicago, Illinois
- Language: Church Slavonic, Serbian, English

Current leadership
- Bishop: Longin Krčo

Map

Website
- Serbian Orthodox Eparchy of New Gračanica and Midwestern America

The Serbian Orthodox Eparchy of New Gračanica and Midwestern America (Serbian: Српска православна епархија новограчаничко-средњезападноамеричка, romanized: Srpska pravoslavna eparhija novogračanička-srednjezapadnoamerička) is a diocese (eparchy) of the Serbian Orthodox Church, covering the midwestern region of the United States.

== History ==
In 1998, the diocese opened the monastic women's Protection of Theotokos Serbian Orthodox Monastery in Ohio under then Bishop Job. In 2006, the monastery moved to Marshfield, Missouri. Later, it moved once again to Weatherby, Missouri on the same grounds as the Saint Xenia Sisterhood and the Holy Archangel Michael and All Angels Skete. Also, there is a fourth women's monastery in Greenfield, Missouri, Saint Pachomious Serbian Orthodox Monastery.

== Structure ==
The Serbian Orthodox Eparchy of New Gračanica and Midwestern America comprises 40 parishes: 13 in Illinois; 6 in Wisconsin; 5 in Wisconsin; 4 each in Texas and Missouri; 5 in Michigan; three in New Jersey; two each in Kansas and Arkansas; and one each in Nebraska and Iowa. The episcopal see is located at Cathedral of the Holy Resurrection, Chicago, Illinois.

The diocese operates 69 churches and 12 monasteries, including:

- New Gračanica Serbian Orthodox Monastery (Third Lake, Illinois)
- Saint Sava Serbian Orthodox Monastery (Libertyville, Illinois)
- Saint Pachomious Serbian Orthodox Monastery (Greenfield, Missouri)
- Protection of Theotokos Serbian Orthodox Monastery (Weatherby, Missouri)
- Holy Archangel Michael and All Angels Skete (Weatherby, Missouri)
- Saint Xenia Sisterhood (Weatherby, Missouri)

== Gallery ==
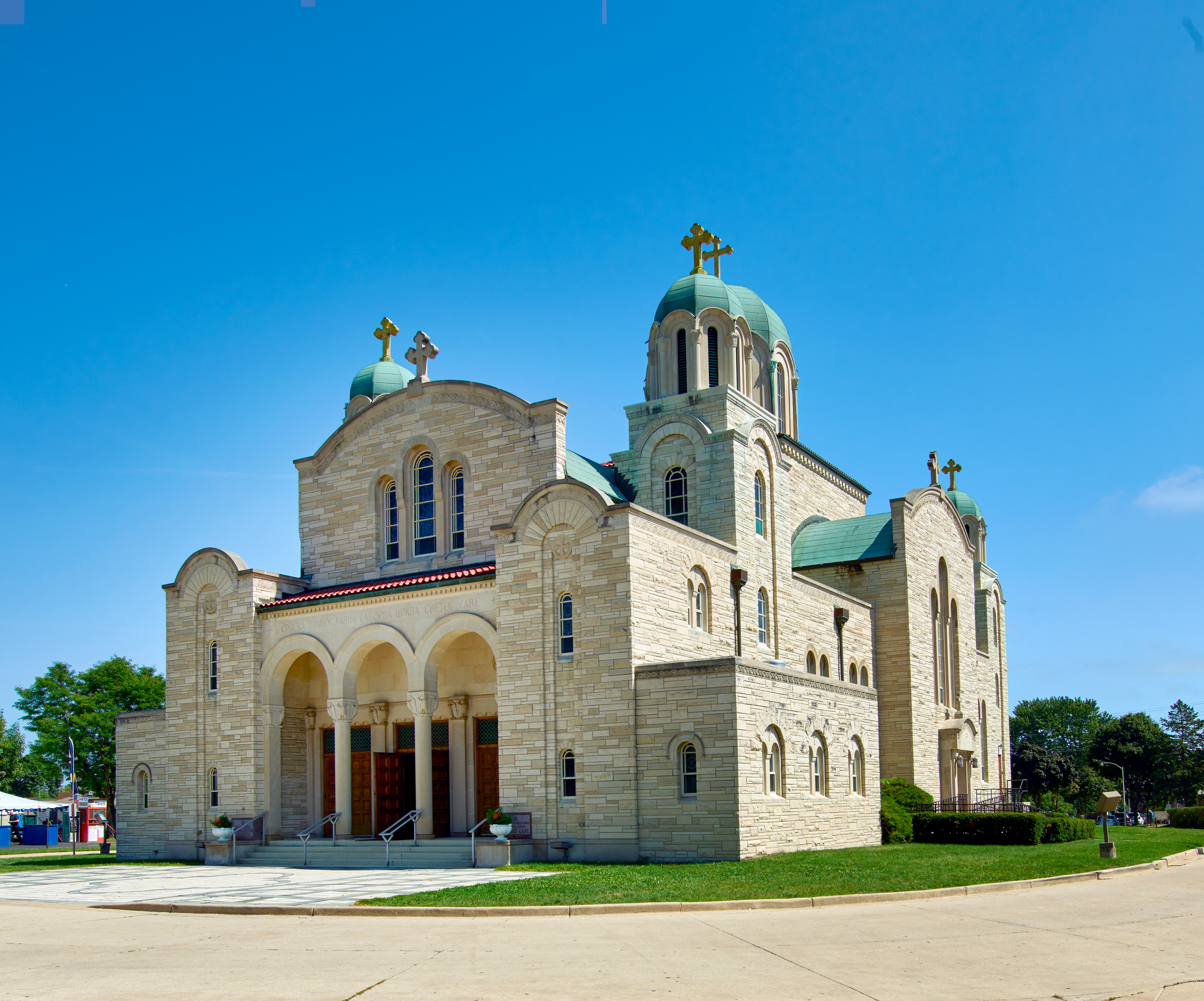
Saint Sava Church (Milwaukee, Wisconsin)

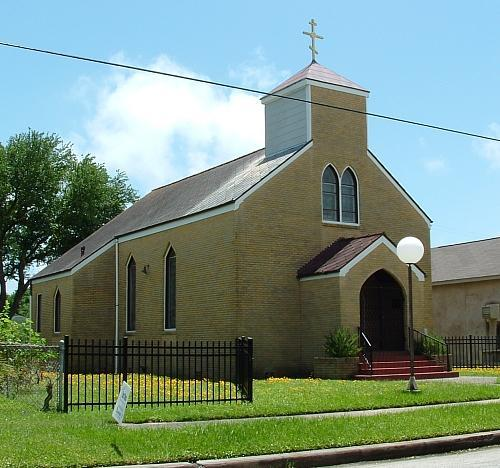
Saints Constantine and Helen Church (Galveston, Texas)

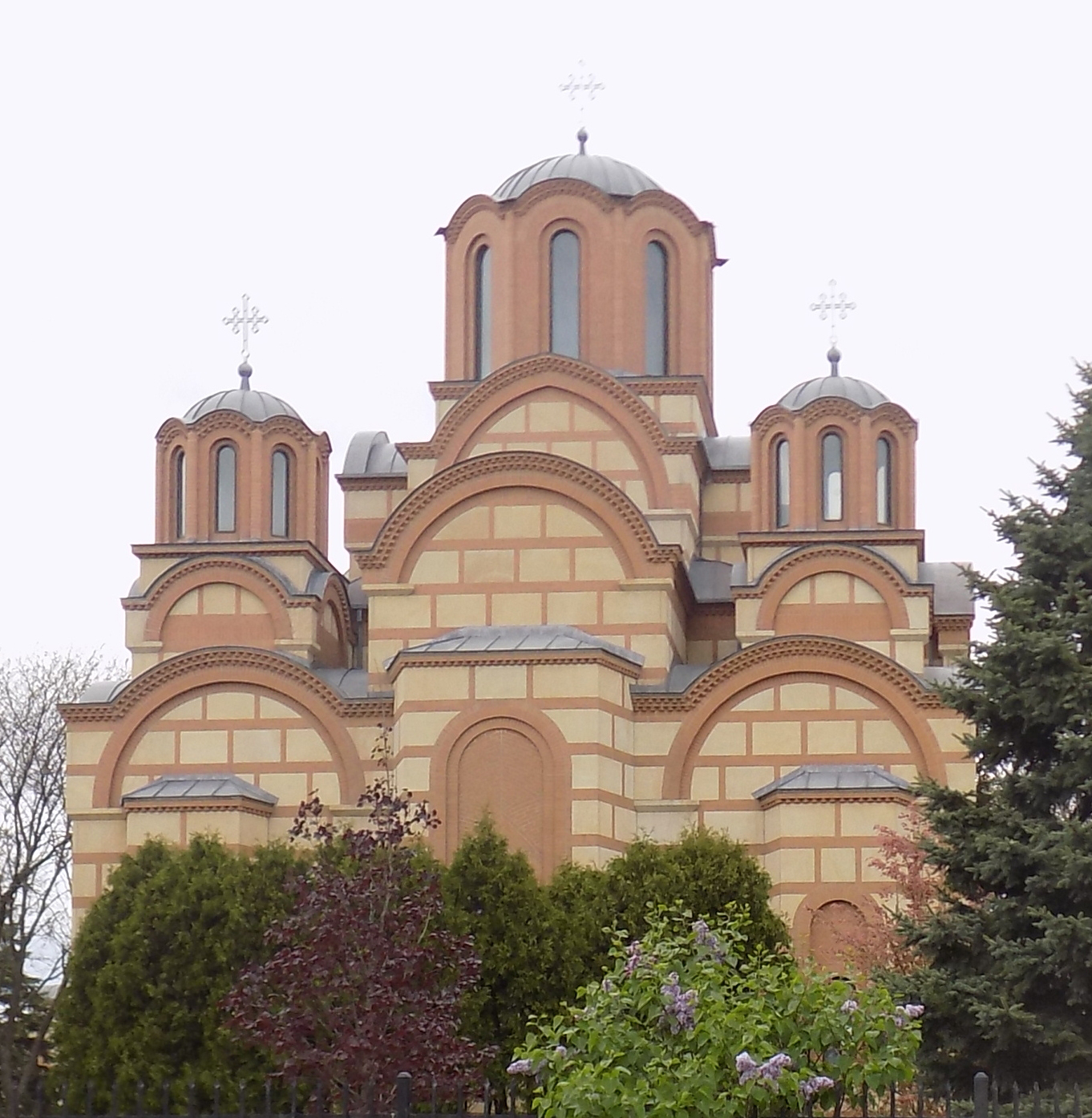
New Gračanica Monastery (Third Lake, Illinois)

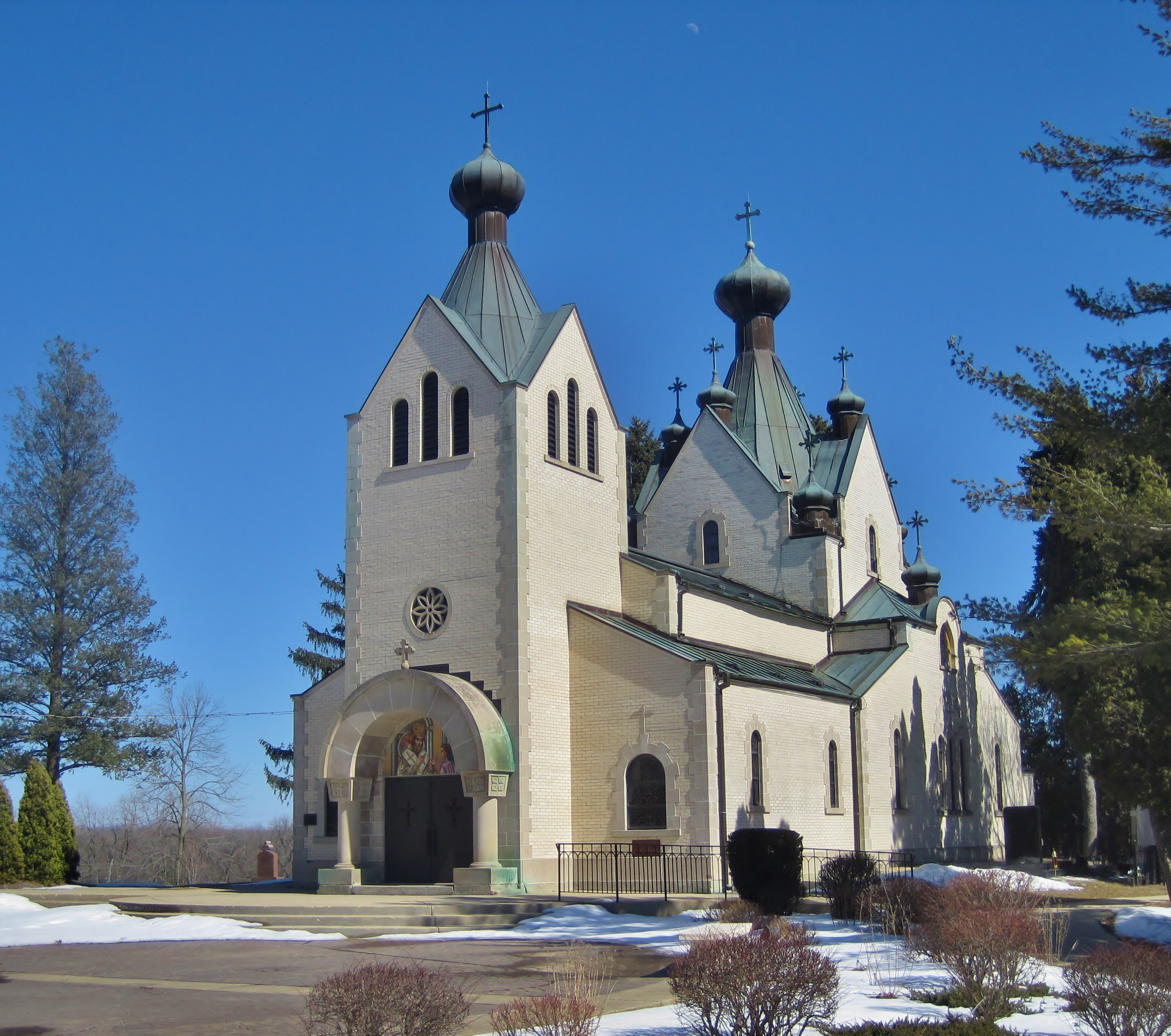
Saint Sava Monastery (Libertyville, Illinois)

== See also ==
- Serbian Orthodox Church in North and South America
- Eparchies and metropolitanates of the Serbian Orthodox Church
- Serbian Americans

== Sources ==
- Vuković, Sava (1998). History of the Serbian Orthodox Church in America and Canada 1891–1941. Kragujevac: Kalenić.
