= Longin Krčo =

Serbian Orthodox bishop

His Eminence Longin Krčo
- Metropolitan
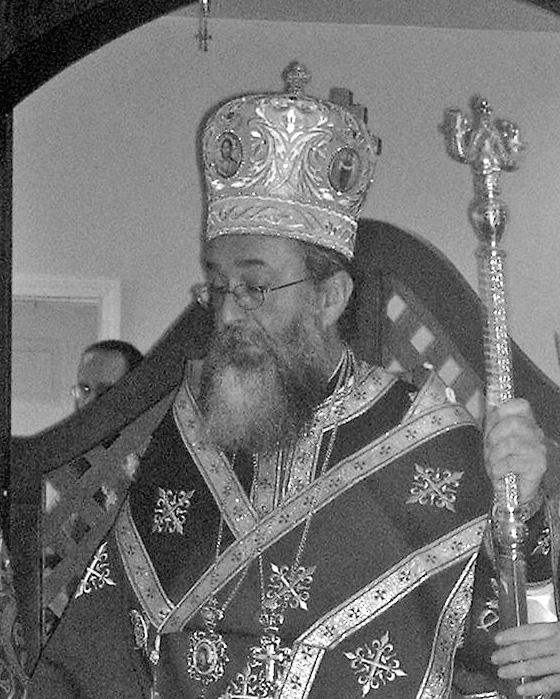
- Bishop Longin in 2006
- Church: Serbian Orthodox Church
- Diocese: Eparchy of New Gračanica and Midwestern America
- Installed: 1999
- Predecessor: Irinej Kovačević
- Previous posts: Bishop of Australia and New Zealand (1986–1992); Bishop of Dalmatia (1992–1999)

Orders
- Ordination: 1975
- Consecration: 1985

Personal details
- Born: Momir Krčo; 29 September 1955 (age 70) Olovo, PR Bosnia and Herzegovina, FPR Yugoslavia
- Denomination: Serbian Orthodox Christian

Longin Krčo (Serbian Cyrillic: Лонгин Крчо; born 29 September 1955) is a bishop of the Serbian Orthodox Church who became head of the Eparchy of New Gračanica and Midwestern America in October 1999. He is one of the longest-serving Serbian Orthodox bishops and has also served as the Bishop of Dalmatia.

== Life ==
=== Early life ===
He was born on 29 September 1955 to father Stanoje and mother Anđa (née Jovanović). He completed his elementary school in Olovske Luke and he then completed the Three Holy Hierarchs theological school at the Krka monastery. He was ordained a monk (being given the name Longin) in 1975 by the then-Bishop of Dalmatia Stefan (Boca) after receiving the Little Schema as a student of the fifth grade.

=== Bishop ===
==== Dalmatia ====
Bishop Longin was appointed the Bishop of Dalmatia in 1992 during the war in Croatia. Due to the war, he was unable to take his seat in Šibenik and used the Krka monastery as diocesan headquarters instead. During Operation Storm, he was located in Australia but he returned to the Balkans immediately upon hearing of the operation. After Operation Storm, he (and the whole seminary from the Krka monastery) stayed at Divčibare near Valjevo for a time.

Serbian Orthodox Church titles
| Preceded by Vasilije Vadić | Bishop of Australia and New Zealand; 1986 – 1992 | Succeeded by Luka Kovačević |
| Preceded by Nikolaj Mrđa | Bishop of Dalmatia; 1992 – 1999 | Succeeded by Fotije Sladojević |
| Preceded by Irinej Kovačević | Bishop for America and Canada; 1999 – 2009 | Diocese abolished |
| New diocese | Bishop of New Gračanica and Midwestern America; 2009 – present | Incumbent |
