= Third Lake, Illinois =

- Village
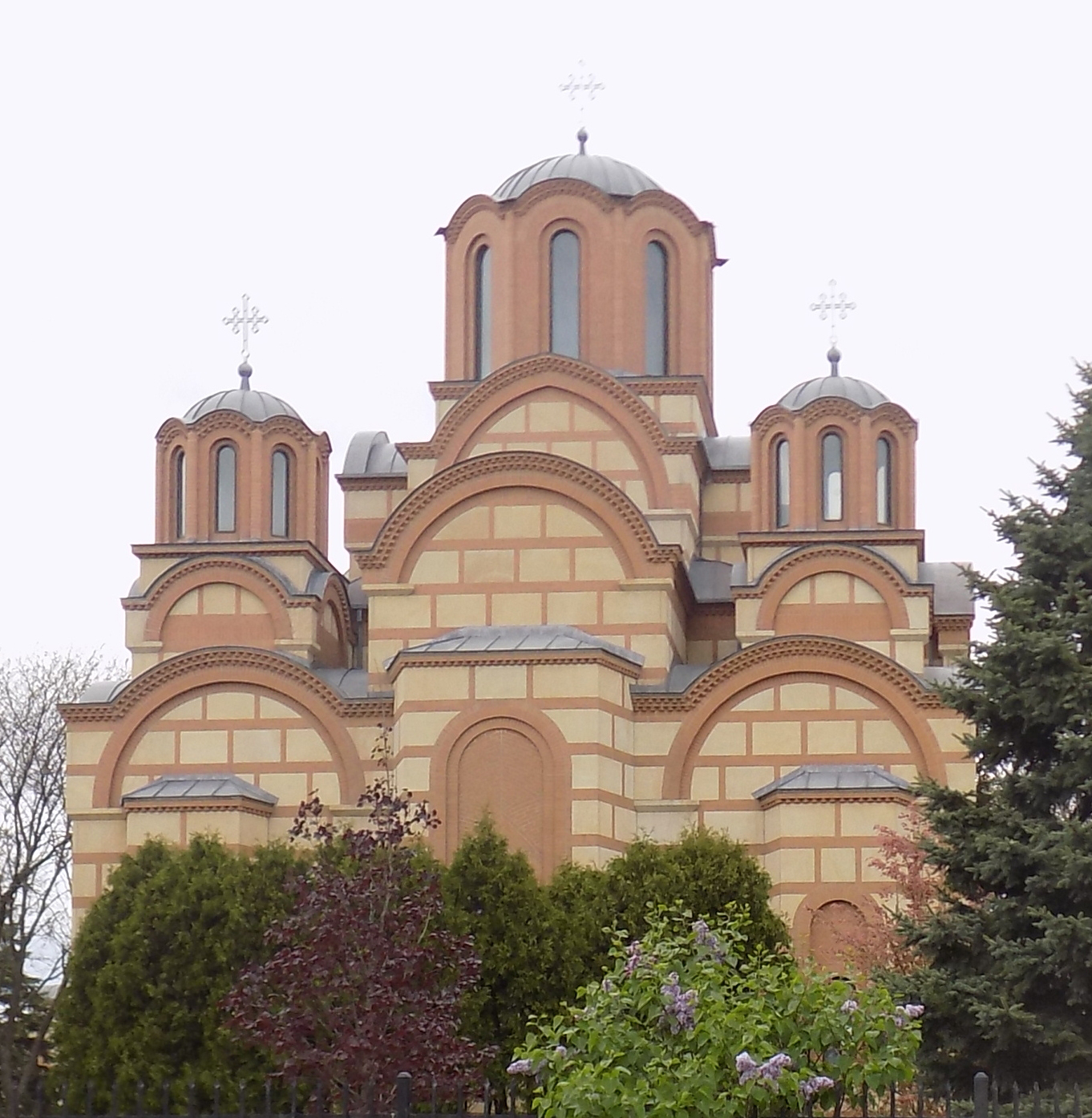
- Nova Gračanica Monastery in 2016.

- Logo
- Motto: "Where Life Meets The Lakes"
- Location of Third Lake in Lake County, Illinois.
- Coordinates: 42°22′25″N 88°01′33″W
- Country: United States
- State: Illinois
- County: Lake
- Townships: Avon Warren, Lake Villa

Area
  - Total: 0.88 sq mi (2.27 km^{2})
  - Land: 0.59 sq mi (1.52 km^{2})
  - Water: 0.29 sq mi (0.75 km^{2})
- Elevation: 764 ft (233 m)

Population (2020)
  - Total: 1,111
  - Density: 1,888.7/sq mi (729.25/km^{2})
- Time zone: UTC-6 (CST)
  - Summer (DST): UTC-5 (CDT)
- ZIP code: 60030
- Area code(s): 847, 224
- FIPS code: 17-75081
- GNIS feature ID: 2399970
- Website: www.thirdlakevillage.com

Third Lake is a village in Lake County, Illinois, United States. Per the 2020 census, the population was 1,111.

== History ==
The Alexander Druce Family were the earliest residents of the settlement in 1861. This family owned the land as well as both Druce Lake and Chittenden Lake. The second of which was named after a farming family from further north, the name would be changed to Third Lake in 1954. The Druce Family cemetery was in place by 1907.

In 1959 Third Lake was incorporated as a village in order to avoid pollution and halt development.

Despite the actions taken, major development of the area began in the mid-1980's in the hands of a development syndicate.

=== Orthodox church and New Gračanica Monastery ===
Third Lake has been the headquarters of the Serbian Orthodox Diocese of New Gracanica – Midwestern America since 1977. Third Lake is home to the New Gračanica church and monastery complex, which houses a detailed replica of the Gračanica monastery in Kosovo. Built on land that the Most Holy Mother of God Serbian Association purchased in 1977, New Gračanica Church and the main building on its grounds dedicated to the feast of the "Protection of the Most Holy Mother of God" were completed and consecrated in 1984. It is an impressive architectural replica of the original Gračanica of Kosovo, but built in a scale eighteen percent larger than the original. New Gračanica is richly attired with detail such as hand-carved wooden entrance doors depicting 23 monasteries and churches from various regions of Serbia.

== Geography ==
According to the 2021 census gazetteer files, Third Lake has a total area of 0.88 square miles (2.28 km^{2}), of which 0.59 square miles (1.53 km^{2}) (or 66.97%) is land and 0.29 square miles (0.75 km^{2}) (or 33.03%) is water.

== Demographics ==
Historical population
Census	Pop.	Note	%±
1960	216		—
1970	199		−7.9%
1980	222		11.6%
1990	1,248		462.2%
2000	1,355		8.6%
2010	1,182		−12.8%
2020	1,111		−6.0%
U.S. Decennial Census; 2010 2020

=== Racial and ethnic composition ===
Third Lake village, Illinois – Racial and ethnic composition Note: the US Census treats Hispanic/Latino as an ethnic category. This table excludes Latinos from the racial categories and assigns them to a separate category. Hispanics/Latinos may be of any race.
Race / Ethnicity (NH = Non-Hispanic)	Pop 2000	Pop 2010	Pop 2020	% 2000	% 2010	% 2020
White alone (NH)	1,267	1,077	938	93.51%	91.12%	84.43%
Black or African American alone (NH)	5	4	17	0.37%	0.34%	1.53%
Native American or Alaska Native alone (NH)	0	3	3	0.00%	0.25%	0.27%
Asian alone (NH)	23	15	21	1.70%	1.27%	1.89%
Native Hawaiian or Pacific Islander alone (NH)	0	0	0	0.00%	0.00%	0.00%
Other race alone (NH)	0	1	2	0.00%	0.08%	0.18%
Mixed race or Multiracial (NH)	15	13	32	1.11%	1.10%	2.88%
Hispanic or Latino (any race)	45	69	98	3.32%	5.84%	8.82%
Total	1,355	1,182	1,111	100.00%	100.00%	100.00%

=== 2020 census ===
As of the 2020 census, Third Lake had a population of 1,111. The median age was 48.6 years. 19.1% of residents were under the age of 18 and 18.5% were 65 years of age or older. For every 100 females there were 104.6 males, and for every 100 females age 18 and over there were 105.3 males.

100.0% of residents lived in urban areas, while 0.0% lived in rural areas.

The population density was 1,265.38 inhabitants per square mile (488.57/km^{2}). There were 433 housing units at an average density of 493.17 per square mile (190.41/km^{2}). There were 424 households in Third Lake, of which 36.1% had children under the age of 18 living in them. Of all households, 73.1% were married-couple households, 11.1% were households with a male householder and no spouse or partner present, and 13.0% were households with a female householder and no spouse or partner present. About 11.5% of all households were made up of individuals, and 5.0% had someone living alone who was 65 years of age or older.

Of housing units, 2.1% were vacant. The homeowner vacancy rate was 0.2% and the rental vacancy rate was 0.0%.

=== Income and poverty ===
The median income for a household in the village was $135,021, and the median income for a family was $136,377. Males had a median income of $68,264 versus $50,066 for females. The per capita income for the village was $54,025. About 0.0% of families and 4.3% of the population were below the poverty line, including 0.0% of those under age 18 and 8.9% of those age 65 or over.

== Transportation ==
Pace provides bus service on Routes 565, 572, and 574 connecting Third Lake to Grayslake, Waukegan, and other destinations.

=== Major streets ===
- Rollins Road
- Washington Street
