= Archdiocese of Belgrade and Karlovci =

Diocese of the Serbian Orthodox Church

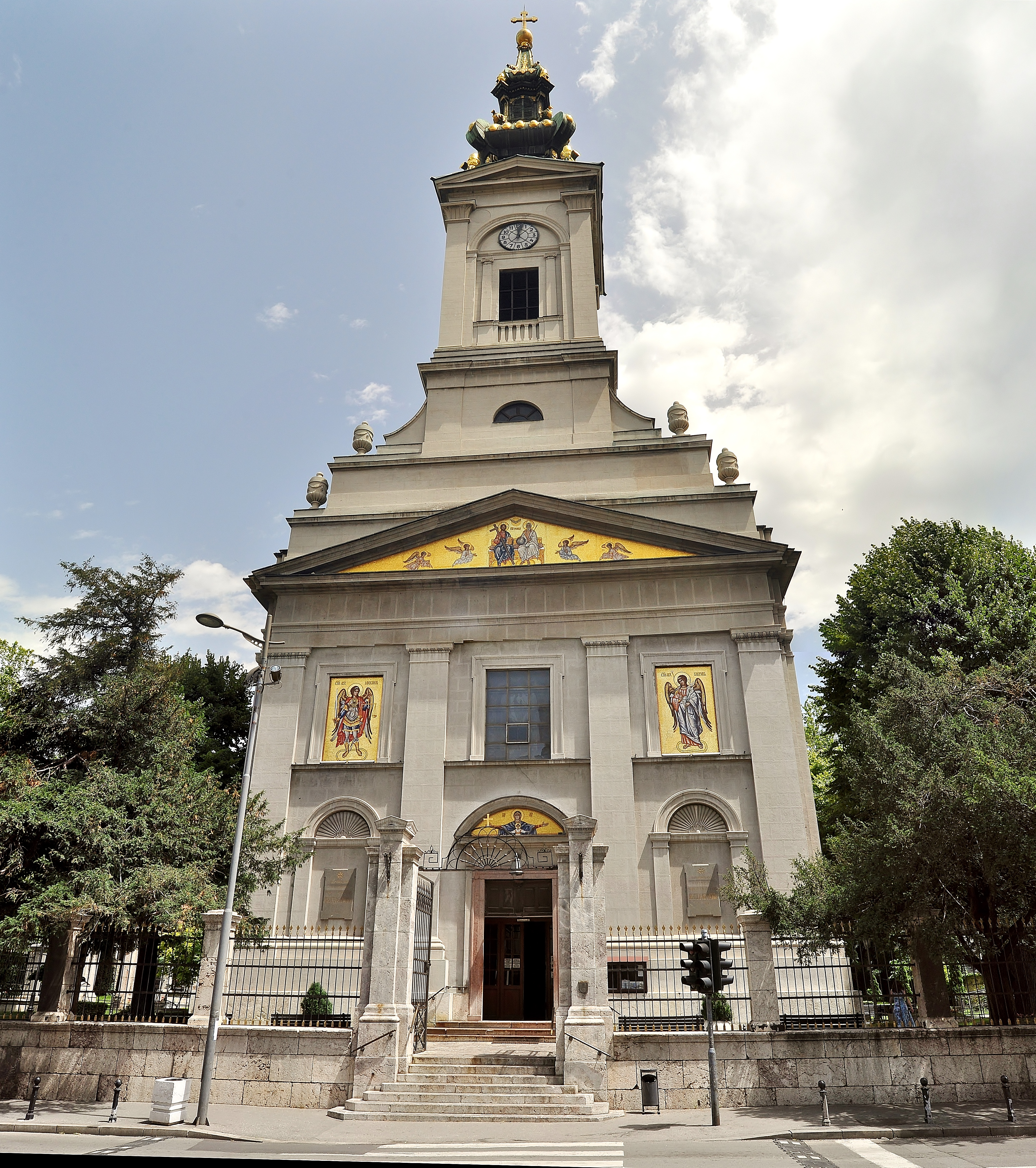
- Cathedral of Saint Archangel Michael, Belgrade

Location
- Territory: Belgrade
- Headquarters: Palace of the Patriarchate, Belgrade, Serbia

Information
- Denomination: Eastern Orthodox
- Sui iuris church: Serbian Orthodox Church
- Established: 1931
- Cathedral: Cathedral of Saint Archangel Michael, Belgrade
- Language: Church Slavonic, Serbian

Current leadership
- Archbishop: Porfirije

Map

The Archdiocese of Belgrade and Karlovci (Serbian: Архиепископија београдско-карловачка, romanized: Arhiepiskopija beogradsko-karlovačka) is an archdiocese of the Serbian Orthodox Church covering the city of Belgrade, capital of Serbia. It is central or patriarchal diocese, headed by the Serbian Patriarch.

The episcopal see is located at the Cathedral of Saint Archangel Michael while its headquarters are located at the Palace of the Patriarchate.

== History ==
Diocese of Belgrade is one of the oldest ecclesiastical institutions in this part of Europe. Ancient Bishopric of Singidunum was an important ecclesiastical center of the late Roman Empire during 4th and 5th century. Its bishops Ursacius and Secundianus were actively involved in religious controversies over Arianism. That ancient bishopric finally collapsed after 584 when ancient Singidunum was finally destroyed by Avars.

After the Christianization of Slavs, the eparchy was renewed as late as 9th century, with the oldest known bishop of Belgrade being Sergios in 878. Byzantine rule in Belgrade was reinstated in 1018, and in 1019 Belgrade is mentioned as one of 16 episcopal seats of the Archbishopric of Ohrid. The Eparchy of Belgrade included also ecclesiastical centres in Gradac, Užice, Bela Crkva, Glavetina, and included 40 clergymen and 40 village priests, making it one of the richest and largest in the Ohrid Archbishopric. In the early 13th century, Belgrade was a battleground between Hungarian and Bulgarian rulers, and after Hungarian takeover in the 1230s, the Pope Gregory IX organized the eparchies of Belgrade and Braničevo under the newly established Bishopric of Syrmia. Belgrade and other territory was ceded by the Hungarian king to Serbian king Stefan Dragutin some time after 1284, and the Catholic church organization in Syrmia was suppressed, with the Serbian Orthodox bishop of Mačva being seated at Belgrade. The Serbian diocese of Mačva most likely stretched throughout the "Syrmian Lands". At the beginning of the 15th century, during the rule of Serbian despot Stefan Lazarević, metropolitans of Belgrade were among most influential hierarchs of the Serbian Patriarchate of Peć. Belgrade fell under Turkish rule in 1521, but Serbian Patriarchate was renewed in 1557 with its seat in the Patriarchate of Peć Monastery. During 16th and 17th centuries, Serbian bishops of Belgrade were styled as "Metropolitans of Belgrade and Syrmia".

At the end of the 17th century, regions of Belgrade and Syrmia were separated by the outcome of the Great Turkish War, with Belgrade and Lower Syrmia remaining under Ottoman rule, while Upper Syrmia came under Habsburg rule. In 1708, when the autonomous Serbian Metropolitanate in the Habsburg monarchy was created (Metropolitanate of Karlovci), the Eparchy of Srem became archdiocese of the Metropolitan, whose seat was in Sremski Karlovci. As a result of the Austro-Turkish War, Lower Syrmia and Belgrade came under Habsburg rule. Two seats (Belgrade and Karlovci) were reunited from 1726 to 1739, and then separated again, following the outcome of the Russo-Turkish War.

After that, Eparchy of Srem remained part of the Metropolitanate of Karlovci (Patriarchate of Karlovci after 1848) until 1920, while the Eparchy of Belgrade was returned to jurisdiction of Serbian Patriarchate of Peć. After the abolition of the Serbian Patriarchate of Peć in 1766, Eparchy of Belgrade came under jurisdiction of the Ecumenical Patriarchate of Constantinople.

In 1831, Eastern Orthodox Church in Principality of Serbia gained its autonomy from the Ecumenical Patriarchate of Constantinople, and Belgrade became the seat of the archbishop who was now metropolitan of Serbia. At that time, territory of the archdiocese was very large and included regions of present-day dioceses of Šumadija and Braničevo. The Metropolitanate gained autocephaly in 1879.

In 1920, after the unification of all Serbian ecclesiastical units into unified Serbian Orthodox Church, old Eparchy of Srem with its seat in Sremski Karlovci came under direct administration of the archbishop of Belgrade who was also the Serbian patriarch. Formal unification of two eparchies was completed in 1931 when Archdiocese of Belgrade was joined with the Eparchy of Srem into the Archdiocese of Belgrade and Karlovci. In that time, the city of Pančevo was transferred from Eparchy of Vršac to the Archdiocese of Belgrade and Karlovci. In 1947, Eparchy of Srem and Eparchy of Šumadija were excluded from the Archdiocese of Belgrade and Karlovci and were transformed into separate dioceses. The city of Pančevo was returned to the Eparchy of Banat. Although, the name of the Archdiocese of Belgrade and Karlovci includes the name of the town of Sremski Karlovci, this town is today part of the Eparchy of Srem and not of the Archdiocese of Belgrade and Karlovci which nowadays encompasses the City of Belgrade.

== List of bishops ==
=== Serbian Archbishopric ===
Primate	Tenure	Title
Jovan	(around 1317)	Bishop of Mačva and Belgrade

=== Serbian Patriarchate of Peć ===
Primate	Tenure	Title
Isidor	(around 1415–1423)	Metropolitan of Belgrade and Syrmia
Grigorije	(around 1438–1440)	Metropolitan of Belgrade and Syrmia
Joanikije	(around 1479)	Metropolitan of Belgrade and Syrmia
Filotej	(since 1481)	Metropolitan of Belgrade and Syrmia
Teofan	(around 1509)	Metropolitan of Belgrade and Syrmia
Maksim Branković		Metropolitan of Belgrade and Syrmia
Roman	(around 1532)	under Archbishopric of Ohrid
Longin	(around 1545–1548)	under Archbishopric of Ohrid
Makarije	(around 1589)	Metropolitan of Belgrade and Syrmia
Joakim	(around 1607–1611)	Metropolitan of Belgrade and Syrmia
Avesalom	(around 1631–1632)	Metropolitan of Belgrade and Syrmia
Ilarion	(around 1644–1662)	Metropolitan of Belgrade and Syrmia
Jefrem	(around 1662–1672)	Metropolitan of Belgrade and Syrmia
Elevterije	(around 1673–1678)	Metropolitan of Belgrade and Syrmia
Pajsije	(around 1680–1681)	Metropolitan of Belgrade and Syrmia
Simeon Ljubibratić	(1682–1690)	Metropolitan of Belgrade and Syrmia
Mihailo	(around 1699–1705)	Metropolitan of Belgrade and Syrmia
Mojsije Petrović	(1713–1730)	Metropolitan of Belgrade and Karlovci
Vikentije Jovanović	(1731–1737)	Metropolitan of Belgrade and Karlovci
Sophronius	(around 1740–1745)	Metropolitan of Belgrade
Vikentije Stefanović	(around 1753)	Metropolitan of Belgrade
Callinicus	(around 1759–1761)	Metropolitan of Belgrade

=== Ecumenical Patriarchate of Constantinople ===
Primate	Tenure	Title
Jeremiah; Јеремија; Jeremiah	1766–1784	Metropolitan of Belgrade
Dionysius I Дионисије I	1785–1791	Metropolitan of Belgrade
Methodius; Методије	1791–1801	Metropolitan of Belgrade
Leontius; Леонтије	1801–1813	Metropolitan of Belgrade
Dionysius II; Дионисије II	1813–1815	Metropolitan of Belgrade
Agathangelus; Агатангел	1815–1825	Metropolitan of Belgrade
Kiril; Кирил	1825–1827	Metropolitan of Belgrade
Anthimus; Антим	1827–1831	Metropolitan of Belgrade

=== Metropolitanate of Belgrade ===
Primate	Portrait	Tenure	Title
Melentije Pavlović; Мелентије; Melenthius		1831–1833	Archbishop of Belgrade and Metropolitan of Serbia
Petar Jovanović; Петар; Peter		1833–1859	Archbishop of Belgrade and Metropolitan of Serbia
Mihailo Jovanović; Михаило; Michael		1859–1881	Archbishop of Belgrade and Metropolitan of Serbia
Mojsije Veresić; Мојсије; Moses		1881–1883	Administrator of the Metropolitanate of Belgrade
Teodosije Mraović; Теодосије; Theodosius		1883–1889	Archbishop of Belgrade and Metropolitan of Serbia
Mihailo Jovanović; Михаило; Michael		1889–1898	Archbishop of Belgrade and Metropolitan of Serbia
Inokentije Pavlović; Инокентије; Innocentius		1898–1905	Archbishop of Belgrade and Metropolitan of Serbia
Dimitrije Pavlović; Димитрије; Demetrius		1905–1920	Archbishop of Belgrade and Metropolitan of Serbia

=== Serbian Orthodox Church ===
Serbian patriarchs, archbishops of the Archdiocese of Belgrade and Karlovci
Title: Archbishop of Peć, Metropolitan of Belgrade and Karlovci, and Serbian Patriarch
Primate	Portrait	Tenure	Title
Dimitrije [I] Димитрије (I); Demetrius (I)		1920–1930	Metropolitan of Belgrade and Karlovci
Varnava [I] Варнава (I); Barnabas (I)		1930–1937	Metropolitan of Belgrade and Karlovci
Gavrilo [V] Гaврилo (V); Gabriel (V)		1938–1950	Metropolitan of Belgrade and Karlovci
Vikentije [II] Викентије (II); Vicentius (II)		1950–1958	Metropolitan of Belgrade and Karlovci
German [I] Герман (I); Herman (I)		1958–1990	Metropolitan of Belgrade and Karlovci
Pavle [I] Павле (I); Paul (I)		1990–2009	Metropolitan of Belgrade and Karlovci
Irinej [I] Иринеј (I); Irenaeus (I)		2010–2020	Metropolitan of Belgrade and Karlovci
Porfirije [I] Порфирије (I); Porphyrius (I)		2020–present	Metropolitan of Belgrade and Karlovci

== Notable monasteries ==
- Rakovica
- Vavedenje
- Rajinovac
- St. Archangel Gabriel

== Gallery ==
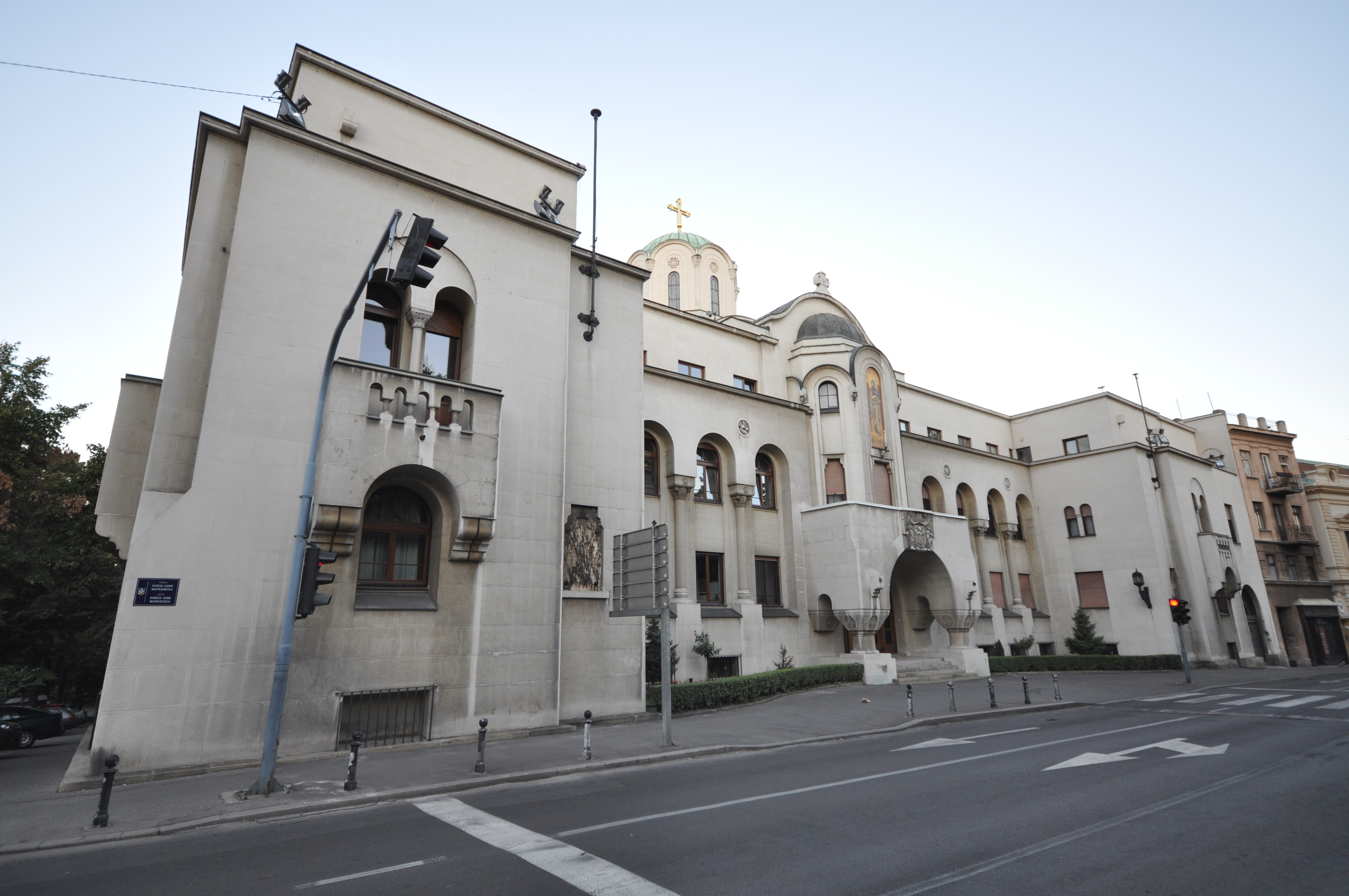
Palace of the Patriarchate

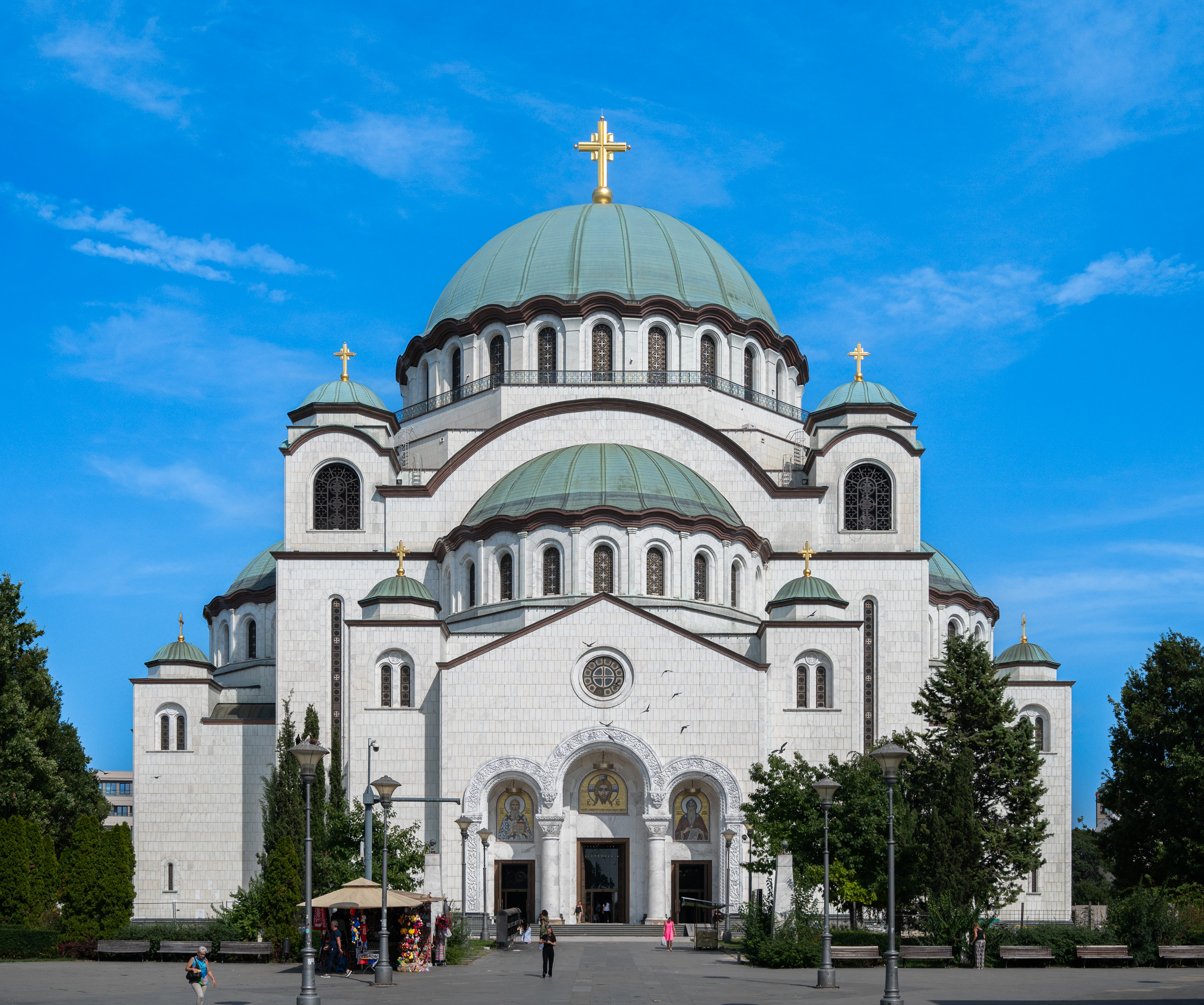
Church of Saint Sava

Church of Saint Mark

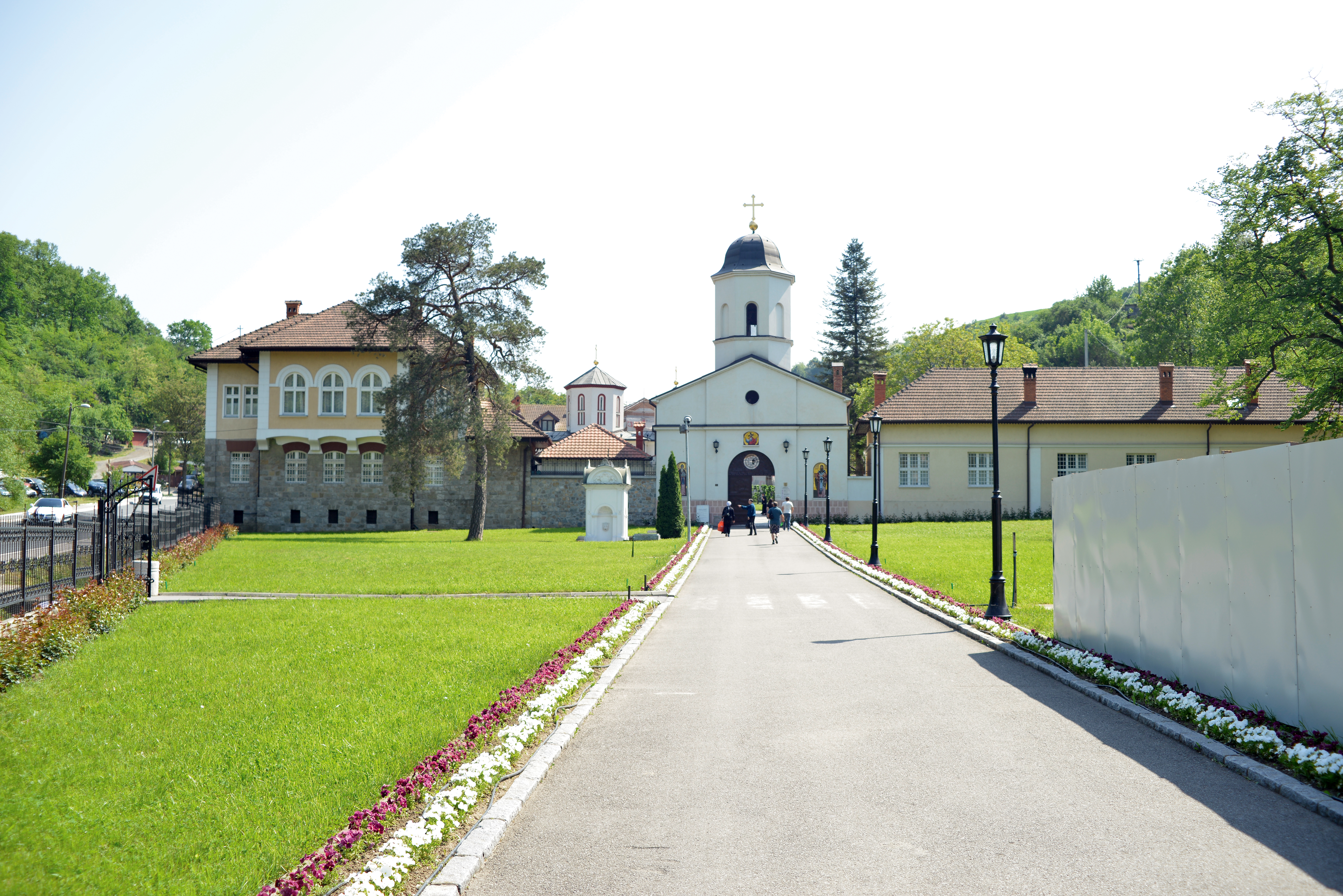
Rakovica Monastery

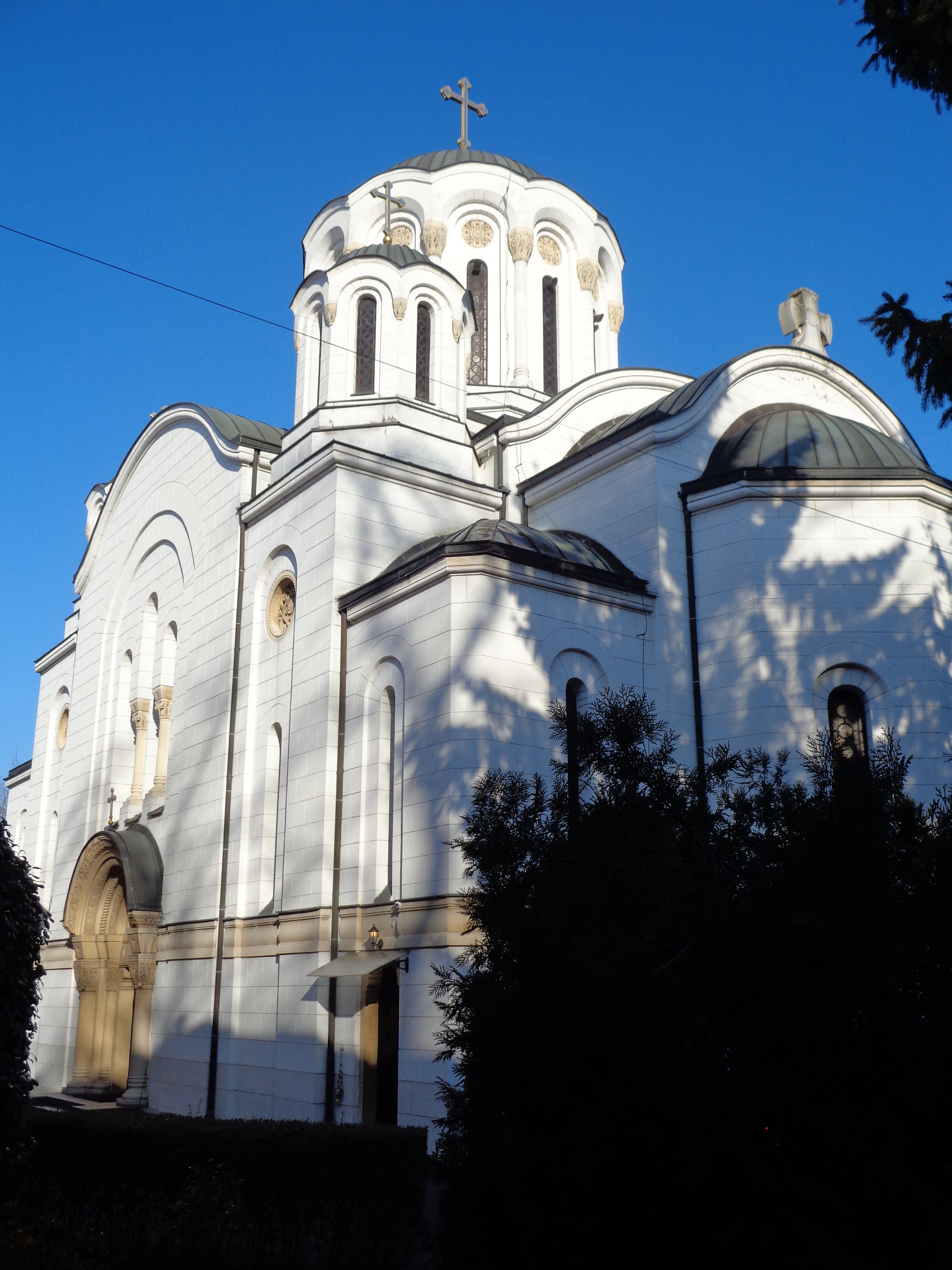
Vavedenje Monastery

== See also ==
- Eparchies and metropolitanates of the Serbian Orthodox Church
- Saint Sava Serbian Orthodox Seminary

== Literature ==
- Dabić, Vojin S. (2011). "The Habsburg-Ottoman War of 1716-1718 and Demographic Changes in the War-Afflicted Territories". The Peace of Passarowitz, 1718. West Lafayette: Purdue University Press. pp. 191–208.
- Đorđević, Miloš Z. (2010). "A Background to Serbian Culture and Education in the First Half of the 18th Century according to Serbian Historiographical Sources". Empires and Peninsulas: Southeastern Europe between Karlowitz and the Peace of Adrianople, 1699–1829. Berlin: LIT Verlag. pp. 125–131.
- Kalić, Jovanka (1967). Београд у средњем веку. Српска књижевна задруга.
- Kalić, Jovanka (2014). "A Millennium of Belgrade (Sixth-Sixteenth Centuries): A Short Overview". Balcanica. 45: 71–96.
- Kiminas, Demetrius (2009). The Ecumenical Patriarchate: A History of Its Metropolitanates with Annotated Hierarch Catalogs. Wildside Press LLC.
- Mitrović, Katarina; Koprivica, Marija (2016). "Београдско-мачванска епископија између православља и католичанства (XI-XIV век)". Прилози за књижевност, језик, историју и фолклор. 82: 3–18.
- Ninković, Nenad (2020). "The Rise of a new center on the periphery of the Empire through the influence of the Archbishops of Karlovci 1690-1790". The Habsburg State-wide and the regions in the Southern Danube basin (16th-20th centuries). Wien: New Academic Press. pp. 25–44.
- Radosavljević, Nedeljko V. (2017). "Antimus, Bishop of Vratsa and Lovech and Metropolitan of Belgrade" (PDF). Bulgarian Historical Review. 45 (1–2): 147–171.
- Radosavljević, Nedeljko V. (2018). "Belgrade Metropolitanate 1825–1831". Belgrade 1521-1867. Belgrade: The Institute of History. pp. 297–313.
- Radosavljević, Nedeljko V. (2020). "Kyrillos, the Metropolitan of Belgrade (1825–1827)" (PDF). Bulgarian Historical Review. 48 (1–2): 73–93.
- Schwicker, Johann Heinrich (1881). "Die Vereinigung der serbischen Metropolien von Belgrad und Carlowitz im Jahre 1731". Archiv für österreichische Geschichte. 62: 305–450.
- Točanac-Radović, Isidora (2018). "Belgrade - Seat of the Archbishopric and Metropolitanate (1718-1739)". Belgrade 1521-1867. Belgrade: The Institute of History. pp. 155–167.
- Točanac-Radović, Isidora (2019). "Belgrade Under Habsburg Rule 1717-1739". Baroque Belgrade: Transformation 1717-1739. Belgrade: Institute of Archaeology. pp. 12–37.
- Вуковић, Сава (1996). Српски јерарси од деветог до двадесетог века (Serbian Hierarchs from the 9th to the 20th Century). Евро, Унирекс, Каленић.
