= Church of Saint Mark, Belgrade =

Church in Belgrade, Serbia

Church of Saint Mark

- Location within Serbia

Religion
- Affiliation: Serbian Orthodox Church

Location
- Location: Belgrade, Serbia
- Coordinates: 44.8101°N 20.4685°E

Architecture
- Architects: Petar Kratić; Branko Krstić
- Style: Serbo-Byzantine
- Completed: 1940

Website
- Church of Saint Mark

The Church of Saint Mark (Serbian: Црква Светог Марка, romanized: Crkva Svetog Marka) is an Eastern Orthodox church located in Belgrade, Serbia. The church, dedicated to Mark the Evangelist is situated in the Tašmajdan park, near the House of the National Assembly, in the downtown Belgrade. Considered one of the most beautiful edifices of the Serbo-Byzantine style, its exterior resembles that of the Gračanica Monastery, after which it was modelled. Church of Saint Mark is the second largest church in Serbia, after the Church of Saint Sava. There is a small Russian Orthodox church, the Church of the Holy Trinity, next to the church.

== History ==
=== Old church ===
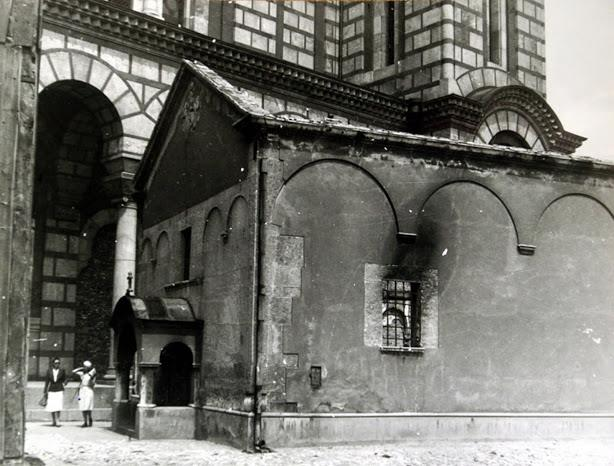
The heavily damaged old church in April 1941 after the German bombing.

The original, wooden church, was built from 1835 to 1836, in the days of Belgrade Metropolitan Petar Jovanović (s. 1833–1859). The main donor was merchant Lazar Panča (d. 1831). Dedicated to St. Mark, it was built within an existing cemetery. It was a rectangular building whose exterior surface area was 11.5 by 21 m and whose interior was 7.75 by 17.46 m. At the same time Prince Miloš Obrenović, who was also a donor to this church, built the palatial church of the Holy Apostles Peter and Paul in Topčider (completed in 1834). Work on both churches was supervised by architect Nikola Živković (1792–1870). In 1838, Prince Milan and bishop Gavrilo Popović of Šabac were buried directly by the church. After the May Coup, the royal couple, King Alexander I and Queen Draga, were buried in this church. In ca. 1870, the church was the parish seat of Terazije with 312 homes and Palilula with 318 homes. It was destroyed during World War I by Austrian troops, then reconstructed in 1917. It was badly damaged in the 1941 German bombing of Belgrade, being hit on Palm Sunday, 13 April 1941. The rubble was cleared in 1942.

=== New church ===
Due to the rapid growth of Belgrade, it became necessary in the beginning of the 20th century to build a larger church. Frequent wars did not allow this until 1930 when a pair of Belgrade architects, the brothers Petar and Branko Krstić, both professors of the University of Belgrade Faculty of Architecture, designed the plans for the new Church of Saint Mark. The present building of Church of Saint Mark was built according to their drawings between 1931 and 1940. The outbreak of World War II interrupted the full completion of the church, especially of the interior. Only the construction work was finished. The foundation stone was laid on 8 May 1931, when it was also consecrated by Patriarch Varnava. The construction began in 1932 and the exterior was finished in 1939.

Divine service took place in the new church during the war in 1941 and after it until 14 November 1948 in the adapted narthex of the church. On that date the church was consecrated by Patriarch Gavrilo V and the church opened for divine service. There were plans to decorate the whole interior with frescoes. The external walls are in two colors of natural materials in the Serbo-Byzantine style. The church bell tower is a part of the church itself on the west side.

Due to the already urbanized area around it, the construction couldn't follow the strict church canon concerning the east-west position. In order to fit into the existing city grid, Patriarch Varnava gave a special permit for the new church to deviate for 10 degrees from the canonical rule. That way, the main entrance came in line with the Resavska Street, across it.

Church of Saint Mark remains to this date unfinished. This relates primarily to its interior, decorating, fresco painting, appropriate lighting, acoustics, heating, and ventilation. After the World War II, little was done in the church itself for objective reasons. Above the entrance door to the church on the external façade is an icon in a mosaic of the Holy Apostle and Evangelist Mark, the work of Veljko Stanojević in 1961. The floor in the church is from 1974, while the floor of the soleia (area in front of the iconostasis and the altar) was done in marble in 1991.

In 2017-18, a complete rearrangement of the plateau in front of the church was done. Old asphalt pavement which served as a parking lot was removed and replaced with a leveled combination of granite slabs and green areas. The plateau was divided in two sections, left and right, divided by the green island. The right, "ceremonial" side is regularly shaped, with the granite slabs posted in the horizontal rhythm, interrupted with the thin squares of red Italian granite. The design is patterned after the façade of the Michelangelo's temples on Capitoline Hill in Rome. The left side has "disheveled" pattern, made of differently sized and combined granite slabs. The 1.8 m (5 ft 11 in) tall bronze statue of Patriarch Pavle was erected on the plateau.

== Architecture ==
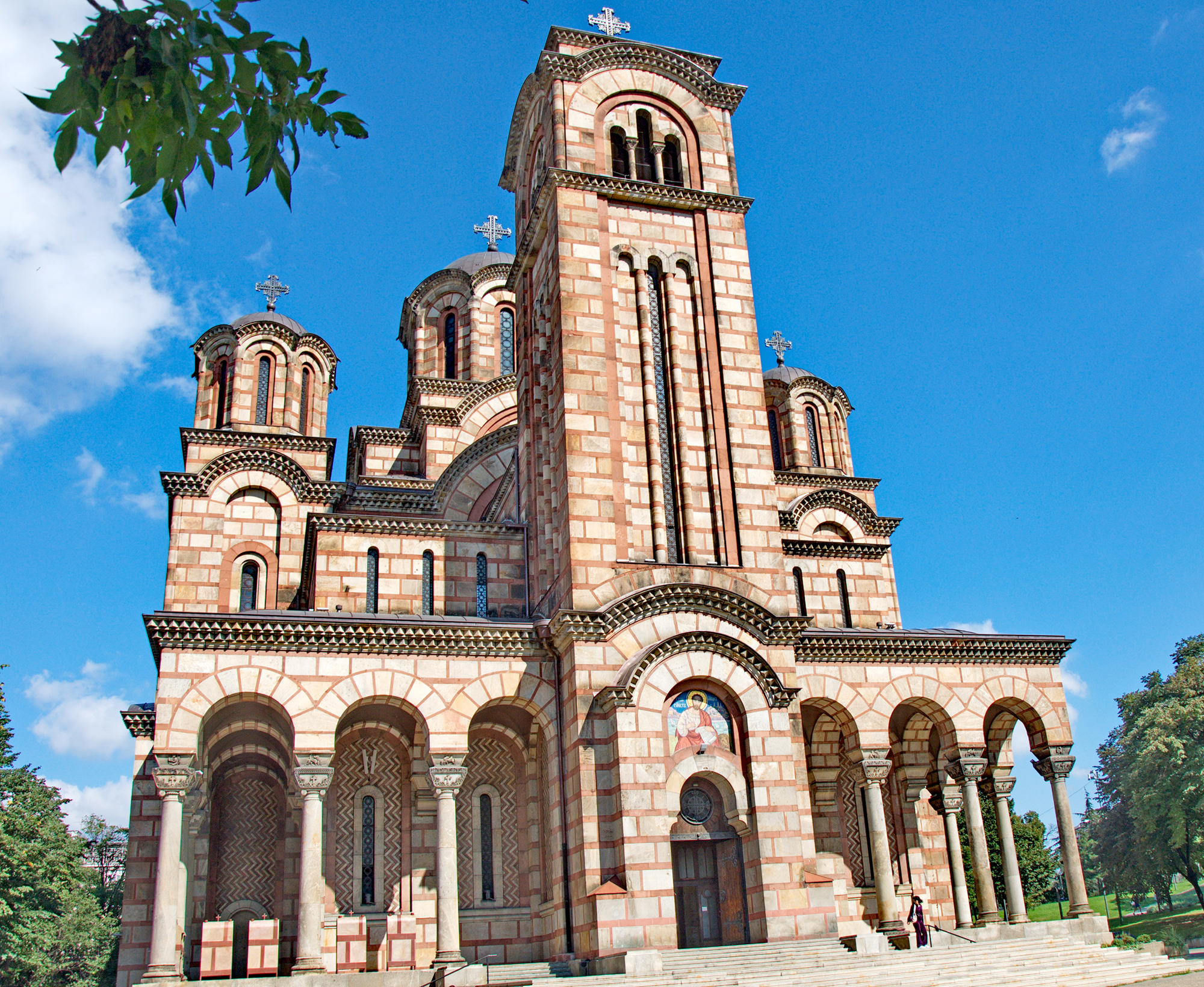
Main entrance

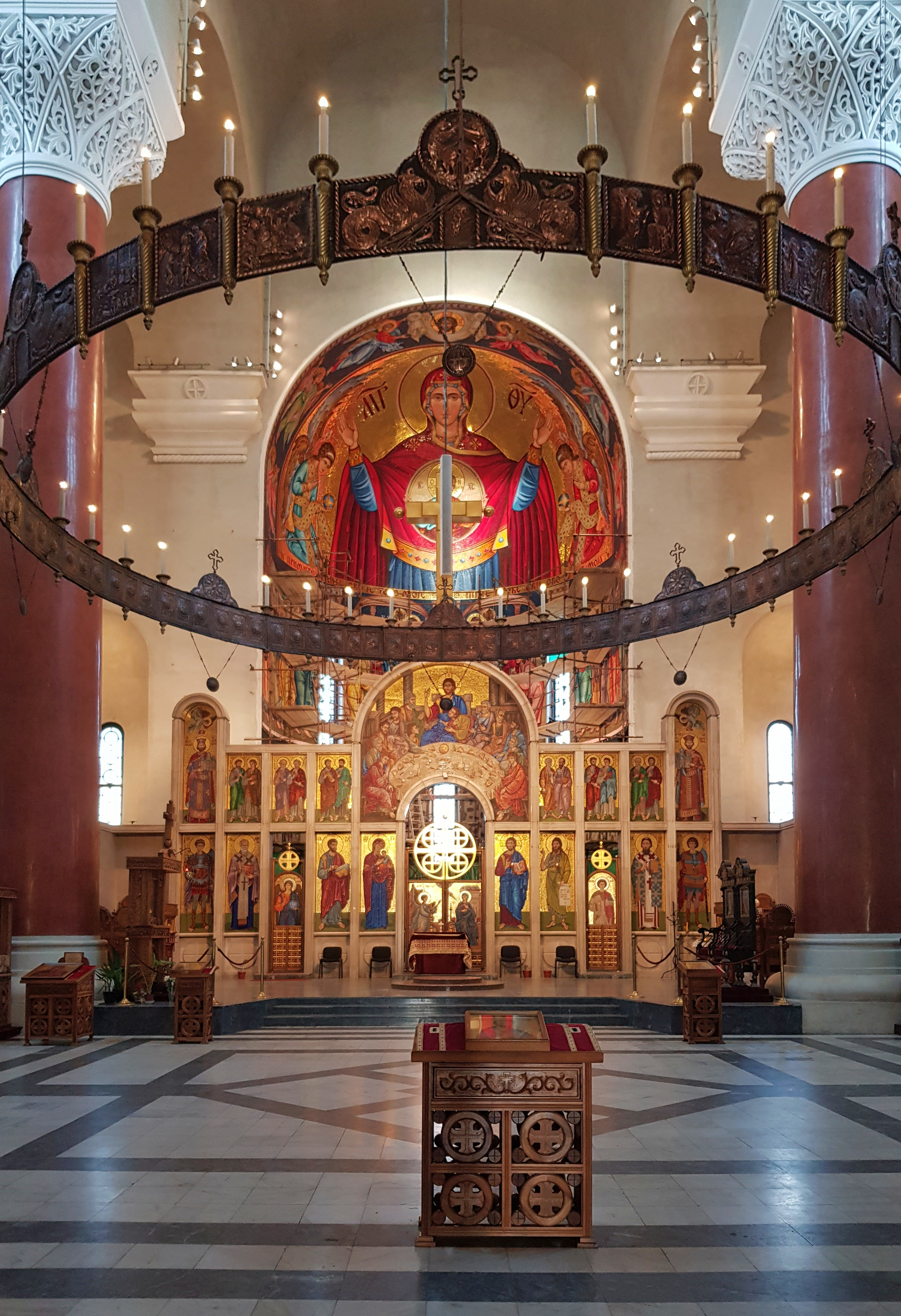
Iconostasis

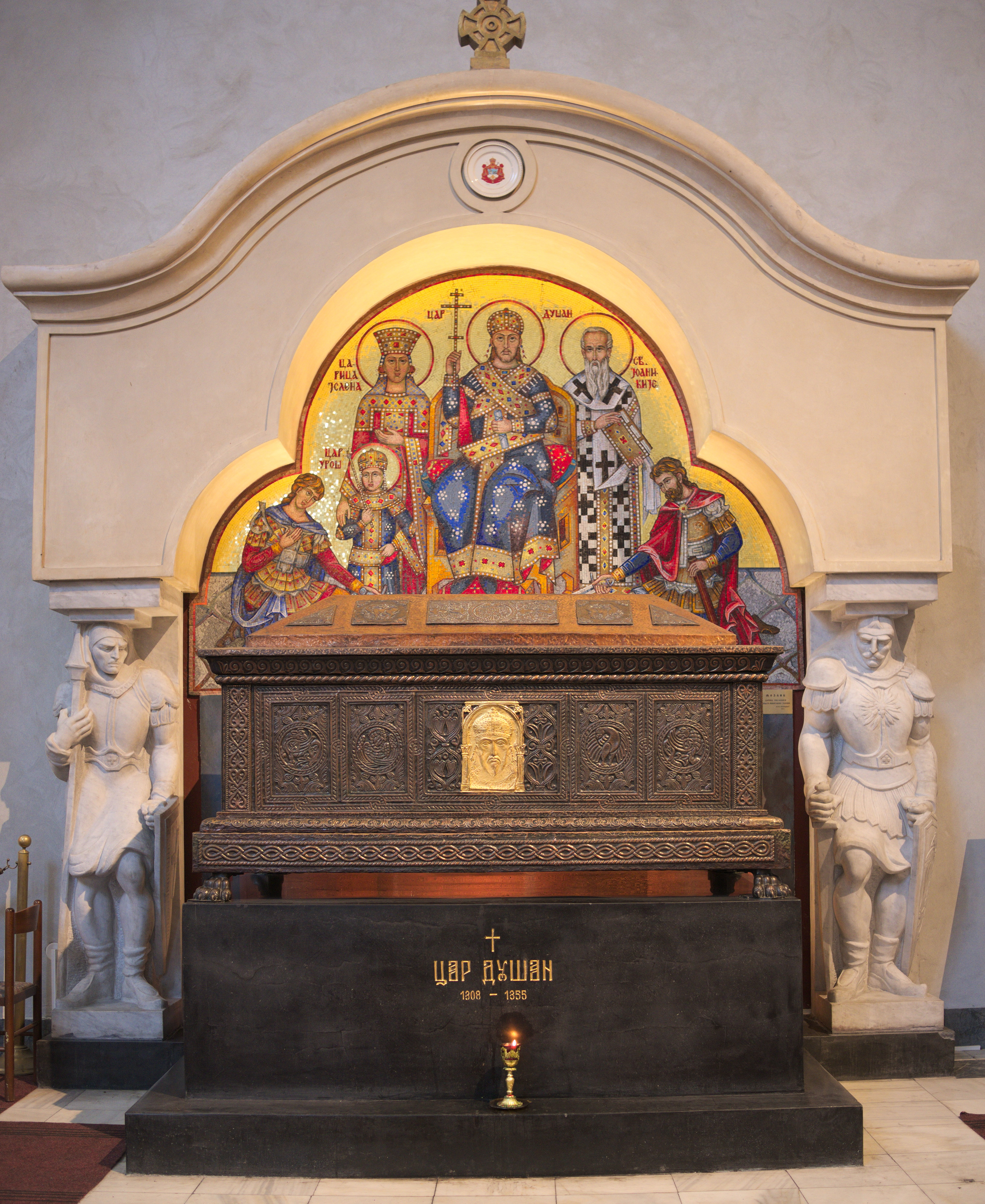
Sarcophagus of the Emperor Stefan Dušan

=== Exterior ===
The church is 62 m (203 ft) long, 45 m (148 ft) wide and 60 m (200 ft) high, excluding the cross.

=== Interior ===
The interiors of the church cover 1,150 m^{2} (12,400 sq ft). The naos can receive 2,000 people and the choir gallery can accommodate 150 musicians.

The central iconostasis of the church, designed by architect and professor Zoran Petrović, dates back to 1992. It was done in marble, while the icons themselves are done in mosaic from 1996 to 1998, the work of painter Đuro Radlović. In 2017, on the 20 metres (66 ft) tall apse above the altar, Radlović placed another mosaic, made from the pieces of Venetian glass. The mosaic represents Bogorodica Širšaja or "Mother of God, Larger than Heavens". Other representations are Communion of the Apostles, and Liturgists, which includes the likes of major Serbian Orthodox saints and clergy such as Saint Sava, Saint Basil of Ostrog, Nikolaj Velimirović, Petar Zimonjić, and Patriarch Pavle.

The iconostasis' mosaic also depicts the Annunciation. Usually, the Theotokos is represented doing some house work while the angel Gabriel announces to her she will become the mother of Jesus Christ through virgin birth, but here she is depicted as being visibly surprised by the notion that she will be the Mother of God. This is believed to be the largest mosaic in any of the altar's apses in the world. It spreads on 130 square metres (1,400 sq ft), of which Mother of God covers 80 metres (260 ft). 10 to 15 thousand of glass pieces are included in each 1 square metre (11 sq ft). Other themes on the mosaic are the Eucharist of the Apostles and representations of Saint Sava, Saint Basil of Ostrog, Nikolaj Velimirović, and Patriarch Pavle. Plans were made to fully paint the church's interior, which had bare walls for decades, partially by the mosaics, partially by the frescoes. After two years of preparation, in the summer of 2022, the 100 square metres (1,100 sq ft) large mosaic was placed on the 30 metres (98 ft) tall ceiling above the altar and its apsis. It depicts Christ Enthroned, with two ethereal angels hovering above him. The mosaic is also done by Radlović, and made from the 8.5 million pieces of baked Venetian glass.

The church has three altars. The altar table is also in marble with smaller mosaics on the front side. To the right of the altar is a smaller altar dedicated to the Holy Despot Stefan Lazarević, and the altar on the north side is dedicated to the Transfiguration of the Lord.

As one enters the church on the right side along the south wall of the church is the marble tomb of Emperor Stefan Dušan (r. 1331–55), designed by Dragomir Tadić. The emperor was originally buried in his endowment, the Monastery of the Holy Archangels near Prizren. The monastery laid in ruins for centuries. During the survey of the locality in 1927, historian Radoslav Grujić discovered emperor's relics and handed them over to the Palace of the Patriarchate where they rested until 1968, when they were relocated to the Church of Saint Mark. On the opposite side, the tomb of Patriarch German (d. 1991) has been built in the same style and of the same material. There are mosaics above the emperor's and patriarch's tombs, done by Đuro Radlević: "Crowning of Emperor Dušan", and "Eye of Providence", respectively.

Inside is also a 100 kilograms (220 lb) heavy beehive in the form of the scale model of the church. In the middle of the church underneath the central cupola is apolielei, a wheel chandelier, done in copper according to the design of Dragomir Tadić in 1969, and executed by academic sculptor Dragutin Petrović.

Below the narthex of the church is the crypt which was adapted during 2007. It is installed new ground marble, climatization, and ventilation, sound system, and graves were readopted. In it are several tombs transferred from the original church: Metropolitan Teodosije (1815–1892), Bishop Viktor Čolakov of Niš (1797–1888), Bishop Gavrilo Popović of Šabac (1811-1871), and Bishop Mojsije Veresić of Timok (1835–1896). Also interred here are King Alexander I and Queen Draga (†1903), Ana Jovana Obrenović (†1880), princes Milan Obrenović (1819–1839) and Sergije Obrenović (†1878), and the grave of the patron endower of the old church, Lazar Panča. In general, the entire space of the very large crypt is little used and suitable for a gallery, museum or display area.

The church treasury is presently located in a room on the south side and contains a rich collection of icons and precious artifacts. The most valuable icons are Theotokos with Christ from the 16th century; Jesus Christ on the Throne, an icon from the end of the 18th century; Saint Nicholas on the Throne, Holy Emperor Constantine and Empress Helen, an icon from the first half of the 19th century; Saint Demetrios and Saint George, an icon from 1849; Theotokos with the Saints, an icon from the first half of the 19th century; Saint George and Saint Demetrios, an icon from the mid-19th century; Crowning of the Most Holy Theotokos, an icon from the mid-19th century; Holy Emperor Constantine and Empress Helen (Exaltation of the Honorable Cross), an icon from the mid-19th century; Theotokos with Christ, the Holy Prophet Daniel and Saint John the Baptist, an icon from 1863; Theotokos of Arabia, an icon from 1872; Saint Sava, an icon from 1870; Holy King Stefan of Dečani, an icon from 1883; Holy Apostle and Evangelist Mark, an icon from the end of the 19th century; Holy Archangel Michael, an icon from 1889; the Pilgrims' icon (the Theotokos, Jesus Christ, the apostles, the Final Judgment), an icon from the end of the 19th century; Saint George Killing the Dragon, an icon from 1926; and many other icons. The icons are primarily the work of eminent painters and icon painters of the 19th and 20th centuries: Steva Todorović, Nikola Marković, Dimitrije Posniković, Vladimir Vojnović, Pavle Čortanović, Lukijan Bibić, Vasa Pomorišac, Đorđe Popović, Olga Krdžalić, among others. The 16th century icon of the Hodegetria is believed to be the second oldest icon preserved in Belgrade.

In the name of the Father, the Son, and the Holy Spirit, we do hereby consecrate the cornerstone of this church of God dedicated to the Holy Apostle and Evangelist Mark in the Capital of Yugoslavia, the Royal City of Belgrade, next to the old Church of Saint Mark, on the church patronal feast, April 25 (May 8 according to the new calendar) in the year 7439 since creation and the year 1931 since the Incarnation of our Lord during the joyous reign of His Majesty King Alexander I of Yugoslavia, and the Head of the Serbian Orthodox Church, His Holiness Serbian Patriarch Varnava, who executed this holy act of consecration. — founding charter

== Tombs ==
- King Alexander I
- Queen Draga
- Patriarch German

== See also ==
- List of largest Eastern Orthodox church buildings
