= Viktor Čolakov =

Bulgarian clergyman (1797–1888)

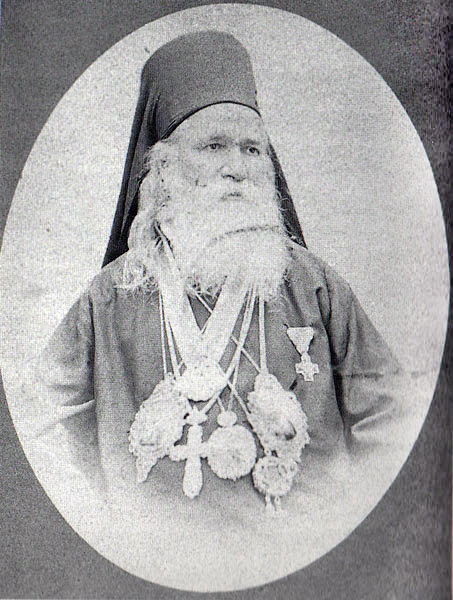
Viktor Colakov Portrait

Viktor Čolakov (secular name: Vŭlko Cholakov; 1797 - 31 May 1888) was the last Metropolitan of Niš of the Bulgarian Exarchate (1872—1878), and the first bishop of Niš of the Serbian Orthodox Church after the Serbian-Turkish Wars (1876-1878).

== Biography ==
He was born in the town Kalofer in 1797, then part known as Rumelia, a part of the Ottoman Empire, now Bulgaria. He received his primary education in his hometown. Subsequently, he entered the Kalofer Monastery as a novice.

Viktor Čolakov became a monk in the Serbian monastery of Hilandar and from there he was appointed in 1835 as a representative of the Hilandar metoh in Niš. He previously became an archimandrite in Hilandar, one of the most willing monks. in the monastery convent he collected donations. From the position of donation collector in Niš, where he spent almost 35 years, he was elected archbishop of Niš and ordained in May 1872 in Constantinople. Later, he was ordained by Metropolitan of Veliko Tarnovo Hilarion, the Bishop of Plovdiv - Panaret, and the Bishop Dositej Samokovski. He began his career within the Ecumenical Patriarchate, to continue as a metropolitan exarch of the Bulgarian Orthodox Church. In the end, he found himself as an archbishop under the auspices of the autocephalous Serbian Orthodox Church in the Principality of Serbia.

The Еxarchate authorities were suspicious of him due to several omissions, but particularly with close collaboration with the Serbs. Although he received only one vote during the elections to the Holy Synod in 1874, he later becomes a member of the Synod, though dared not go to Constantinople anymore. However, in 1875, the Bulgarian Synod wrote about him: "that he was self-willed, disobedient, and rude, and that it would therefore not be bad to remove him from the Niš diocese, even with the help of the government." Bishop Viktor remained faithful to exclusively Orthodox canons during all the breaks and changes.

In the name of the clergy and the people on 18 January 1878, he proclaimed unification with Serbian Orthodox Church and informed Metropolitan Mihailo of Belgrade. This was after the liberation of Niš from the Turks during the Second Serbian-Turkish War and the annexation of Niš, Pirot, Vranje and Prokuplje. His decision was accepted and Metropolitan Viktor was on 1 February 1879 by decree appointed bishop of Niš as part of the Metropolitanate of Belgrade.

By decree Prince Milan Obrenović on 18 January 1878, Colakov was awarded the Order of the Cross of Takovo, 3rd class for merit and independence and liberation. He was the bishop in Niš and the president of the local subcommittee of the Red Cross.

He remained faithful to Metropolitan Mihailo (Jovanović) and after his removal, he was relieved of his duties as archbishop (bishop) on 1 April 1883, because he did not recognize the "Law on Taxes" which also concerned the church and clergy; and then he was transferred to the monastery Petkovica in Diocese of Šabac. He bequeathed 4,000 ducats to the Hilandar Monastery and left the rest of his property for charitable and educational purposes. He died in Belgrade in 1888 and was ceremoniously buried in Church of St. Mark in Belgrade.

He was an honorary member of Serbian Royal Academy of Sciences and Arts from 27 February 1883.

== See also ==
- Kiril Živković
