= Antim =

Antim may refer to:

== People ==
- Antim Panghal, Indian wrestler
- Anthim the Iberian, known as Antim Ivireanul in Romanian Language
- Antim, Metropolitan of Belgrade

== Others ==
- Antim Monastery, a Monastery in Romania
- Antim Cup, a Rugby cup, contested between Romania and Georgia, named after Anthim the Iberian
- Antim: The Final Truth, a 2021 Indian action-drama film
