= Eparchy of Timok =

Diocese of the Serbian Orthodox Church

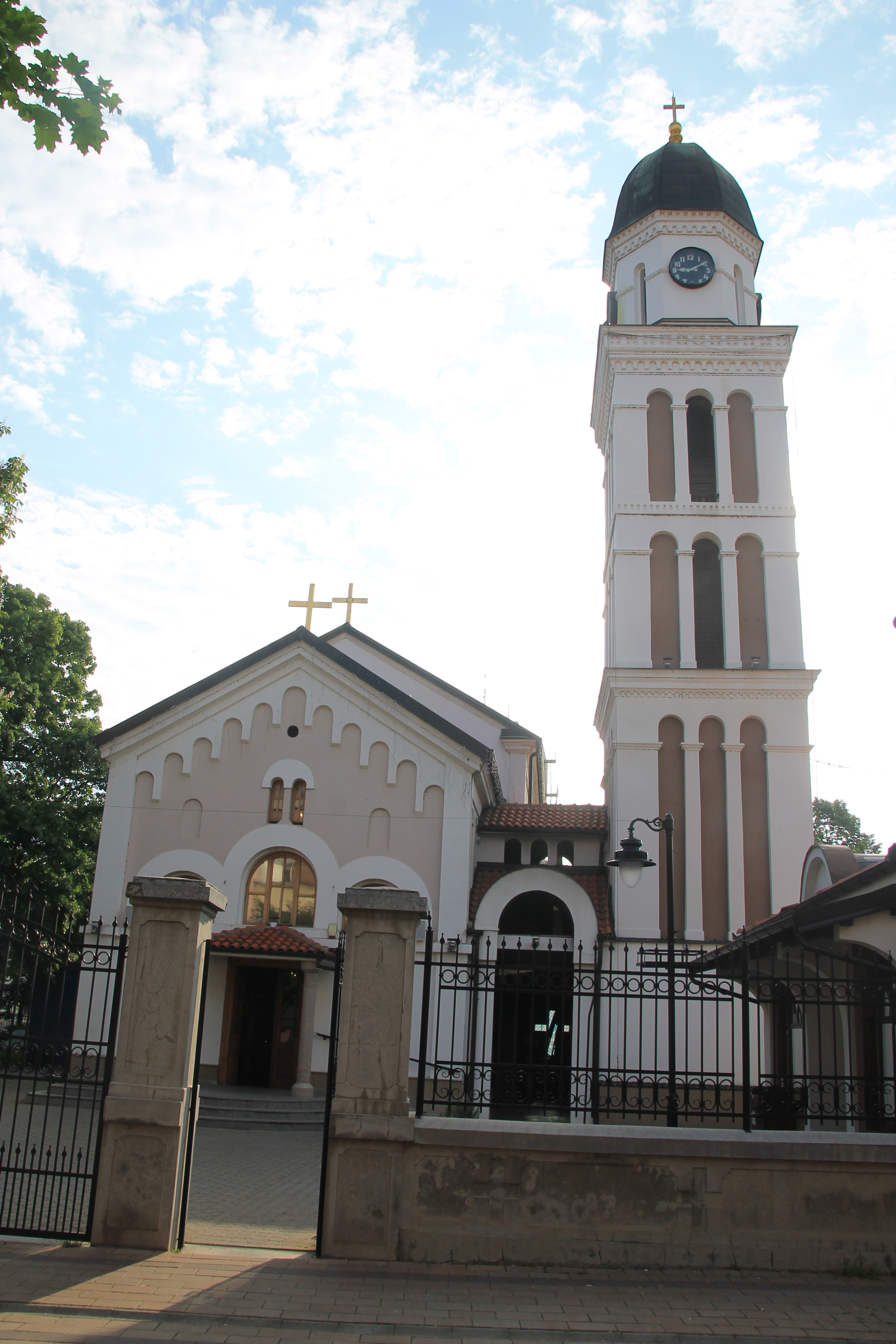
- Cathedral of Nativity of the Theotokos, Zaječar

Location
- Territory: Zaječar District, Bor District
- Headquarters: Zaječar, Serbia

Information
- Denomination: Eastern Orthodox
- Sui iuris church: Serbian Orthodox Church
- Established: 1833
- Cathedral: Cathedral of Nativity of the Theotokos, Zaječar
- Language: Church Slavonic, Serbian

Current leadership
- Bishop: Ilarion Golubović

Map

Website
- Eparchy of Timok

Eparchy of Timok (Serbian: Епархија тимочка, romanized: Eparhija timočka) is a diocese (eparchy) of the Serbian Orthodox Church, covering Timok Valley region in eastern Serbia (Zaječar District and Bor District).

The episcopal see is located at the Cathedral of Nativity of the Theotokos, Zaječar. Its headquarters and bishop's residence are also in Zaječar.

== History ==
Diocese was established in 1833, as a diocese within the Metropolitanate of Belgrade. It was abolished in 1886, but re-established in 1891.

== List of bishops ==
- Dositej Novaković (1834–1854)
- Gerasim Stojković (1854–1865)
- Evgenije Simeonović (1865–1880)
- Mojsije Veresić (1880–1883)
- Melentije Vujić (1891–1913)
- Irinej Ćirić (1919–1921)
- Emilijan Piperković (1922–1970)
- Metodije Muždeka (1970–1977)
- Milutin Stojadinović (1977–1992)
- Justin Stefanović (1992–2014)
- Ilarion Golubović (2014–present)

== Notable monasteries ==
- Bukovo
- Vratna

== Gallery ==
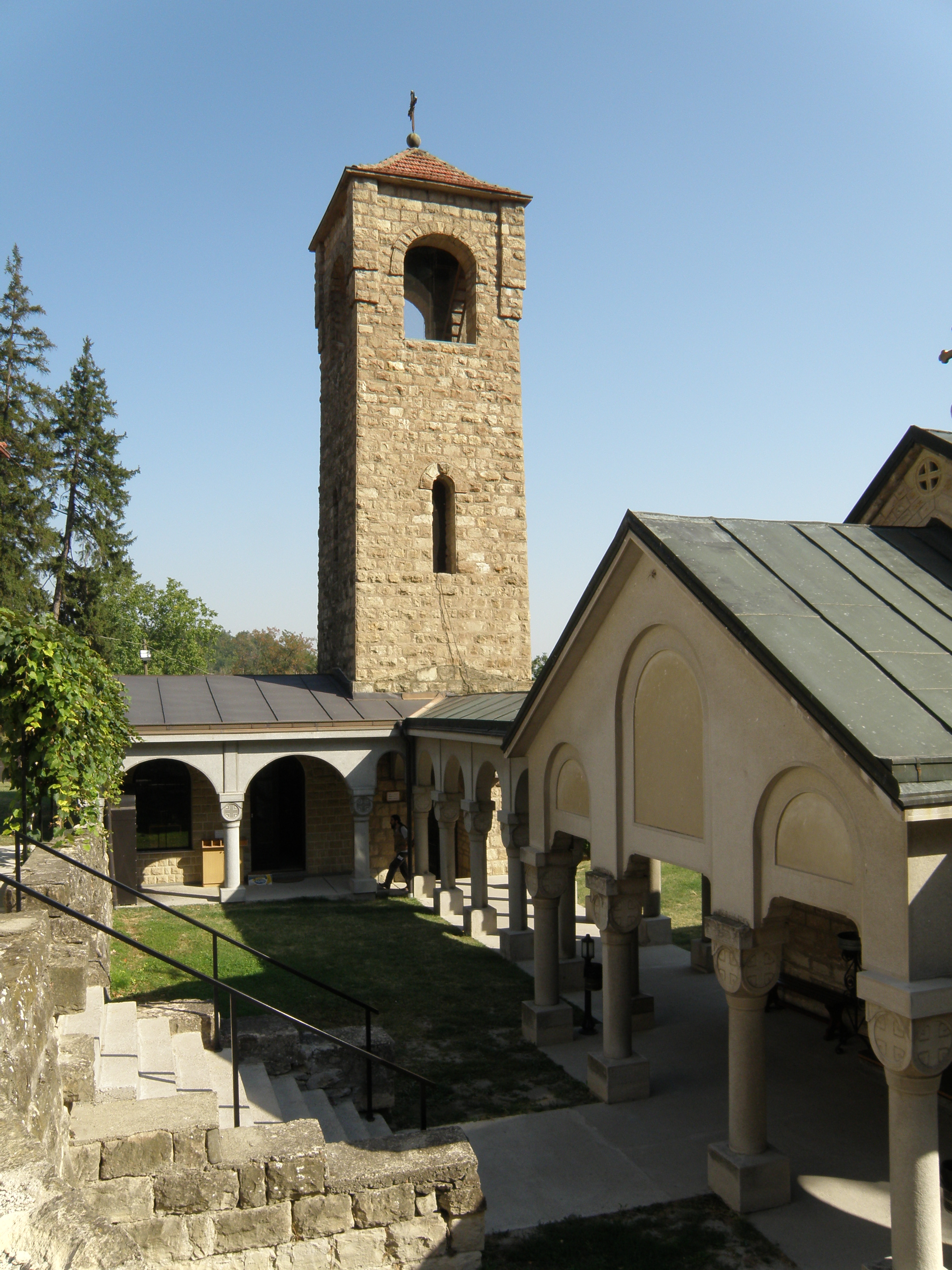
Bukovo Monastery

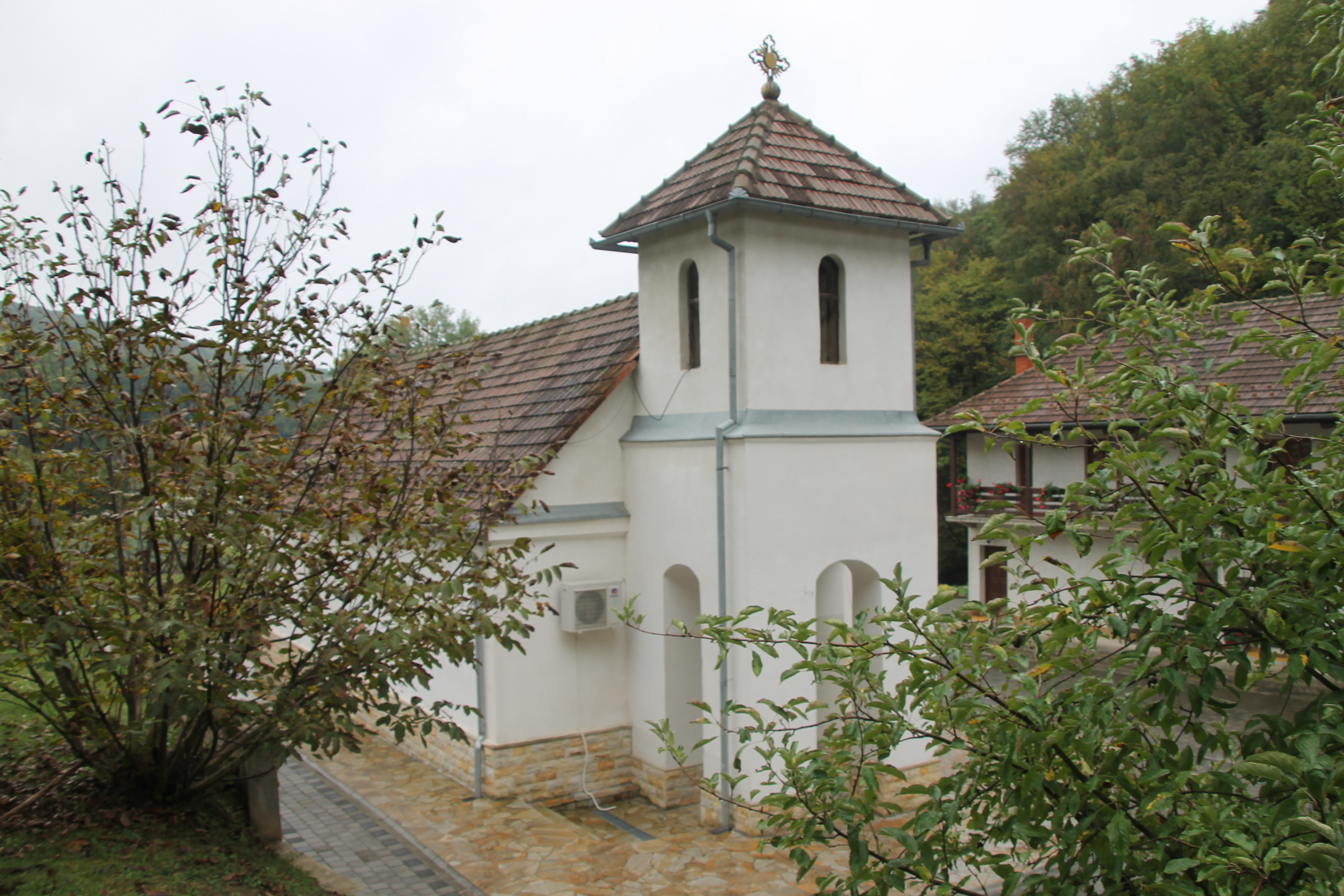
Vratna Monastery

== See also ==
- Eparchies and metropolitanates of the Serbian Orthodox Church

== Bibliography ==
- Ćirković, Sima (2004). The Serbs. Malden: Blackwell Publishing.
- Pavlovich, Paul (1989). The History of the Serbian Orthodox Church. Serbian Heritage Books.
- Popović, Radomir V. (2013). Serbian Orthodox Church in History. Belgrade: Academy of Serbian Orthodox Church for Fine Arts and Conservation.
- Radić, Radmila (2015). "The Serbian Orthodox Church in the First World War". The Serbs and the First World War 1914-1918. Belgrade: Serbian Academy of Sciences and Arts. pp. 263–285.
