= Krstić Brothers House =

- Дом браће Крстић (Serbian)
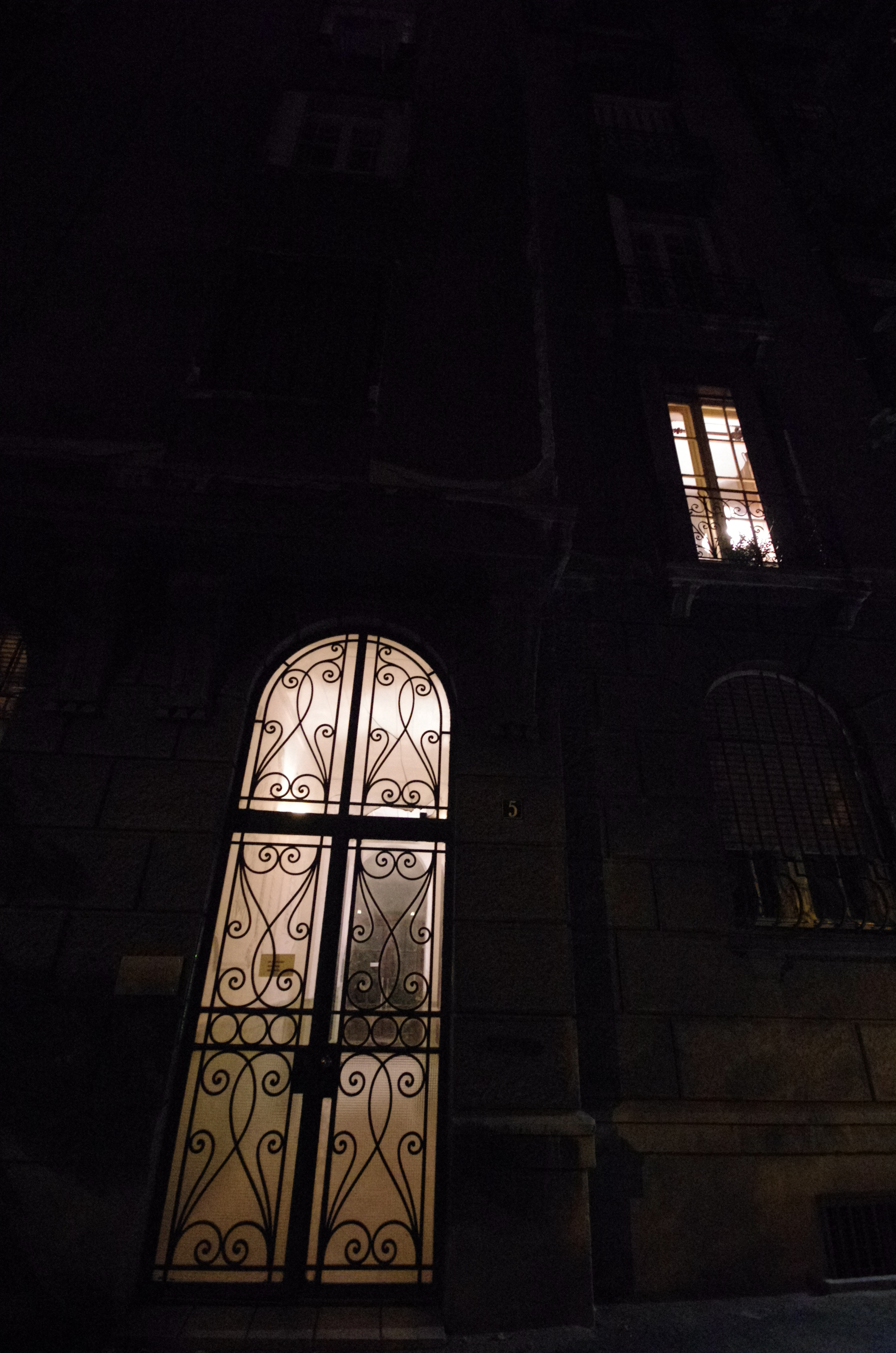
- Interactive map of Krstić Brothers House
- 44°48′18″N 20°27′59″E
- Location: King Milutin street no. 5, 11000 Belgrade, Serbia

History
- Built: 1973

The Krstić Brothers House is located in Belgrade, at the King Milutin street no.5, since 1973, with the status of cultural heritage. The house was built in the late 19th century as a representative of a residential buildings. As there was no saved data of the architect, it was assumed, based on some elements of decoration, that the author of the project could be the architect Јован Илкић. Soon after the raising of the house, Krstic family moved in. The family were known for their two children, a renowned architects Peter and Branko.

This house is one of the few surviving small residential buildings in the territory between Terazije and Slavija Square. Petar and Branko Krstic began their careers by winning projects for the Yugoslav pavilion at the exhibition in Philadelphia in 1925, and then they were awarded for the decision about build-up Saint Sava Temple in 1927. Brothers belonged to a group of architects of the modern direction, and their common work includes dozens of designed and constructed buildings, including the palace, of the Agrarian Bank building, Church of St. Mark, and Igumans palace.
