= Monastery of the Archangel Gabriel =

Monastery of the Archangel Gabriel may refer to:

- Monastery of the Archangel Gabriel at Naqlun, Egypt
- Monastery of St. Archangel Gabriel, Zemun, Serbia
