= Timeline of the Serbian Orthodox Church =

Timeline of the Serbian Orthodox Church includes a listing of the important events and associated dates in the history of the Serbian Orthodox Church from the Middle Ages onwards.

== Middle Ages ==
- 1219: Establishment of the Serbian Archbishopric.
- 1346: Elevation of the Serbian Archbishopric to Serbian Patriarchate.
- 1463: Abolishment of the Serbian Patriarchate.

== Modern period ==
- 1557: Establishment of Serbian Patriarchate of Peć.
- 1691: Establishment of the Metropolitanate of Karlovci
- 1766: Abolishment of the Serbian Patriarchate of Peć.
- 1766: Establishment of the Metropolitanate of Belgrade.
- 1848: Elevation of the Metropolitanate of Karlovci to Patriarchate of Karlovci.
- 1879: Autocephaly of the Metropolitanate of Belgrade.

== Contemporary period ==
- 1920: Unification of the Serbian Orthodox Church.
- 1967: Unilateral establishment of the Macedonian Orthodox Church.
- 1993: Unilateral establishment of the Montenegrin Orthodox Church.
- 2022: Recognition of the Macedonian Orthodox Church.
