= Nikanor Ružičić =

Serbian church historian and bishop (1843–1916)

Portrait of Nikanor

Nikanor Ružičić (Secular name: Nikola Ružičić ; Serbian Cyrillic: Никанор Ружичић; also known in Imperial Russia as Nikolai Grigorievich Ružičič; 15 April 1843 — 16 October 1916) was a Serbian church historian, and the bishop of Žiča from 1886 to 1889 and Niš from 1898 until 1911. He was one of the 19th-century intellectuals who corresponded with Franjo Rački and others raising many questions of the time but nothing of consequence was ever realized. He is the author of a seminal work entitled Istorija srpske crkve (History of the Serbian Church) in two volumes, published in Zagreb in 1894

From the 19th century until the First World War several histories of the Serbian Orthodox Church—including works by Nikola Begović, Nićifor Dučić, Mihailo Jovanović, Jevsevije Popović and Mojsije Stojkov—were written, although none were adequate enough to explain the difference between the Orthodoxy and Roman Catholicism so succinctly as Ružičić's seminal work (History of the Serbian Church).

== Biography ==
Nikola was born on 15 April 1843 in Svileuva to Grigory, a parish priest, and Elena Ružičić, whose grandfather was Karađorđe's voivode Luka Lazarević. He studied at a rural primary school, graduated from Gymnasium in Šabac, then enrolled at the Belgrade Theological Seminary in 1863.

He got married and then entered the priesthood. He first served as a parish priest in his native village of Svileuva. In 1869 he became widowed.

In 1871, on the recommendation of the Serbian Metropolitan Mihailo Jovanović, he was admitted to the Kyiv Theological Academy in the church-historical department in Russia. In 1874 he presented a graduation essay on the relationship between the Serbian Church and the Patriarchate of Constantinople from antiquity to modern times, which was translated into Serbian and published in the Belgrade magazine "Zion". He took a sabbatical in the fourth year of the academy, though he was recognized as a worthy candidate for a doctorate in theology

In October 1874 he was appointed professor of Scripture and Russian.

At the Monastery of Bukovo in 1875, he became a monk and took the name of Nikanor.

During the Russo-Turkish War of 1877–1878, he served as a military chaplain.

In 1881 he passed the professor's examination and received the monastic rank of protosyndjel.

In 1883, after the removal of Metropolitan Mihailo (Jovanović), he was a supporter of the Serbian Progressive Party and was appointed rector of the University of Belgrade's Theological Faculty, recognizing the legitimacy of the powers of Metropolitan Theodosius Mraović as head of the Serbian Orthodox Church.

On 4 May 1886, he was elected Bishop of Žiča. When Metropolitan Theodosius of Belgrade was dismissed like his predecessor, a number of people close to Nikanor were also dismissed. Then, on 28 May 1889 Bishop Nikanor Ružičić himself was dismissed.

He left as an émigré for Austria-Hungary, where he lived in Zagreb and in Dubrovnik, and later in Cetinje, Montenegro. In Germany, he attended lectures at several universities and published works on the history of the Serbian Orthodox Church in the German language in which he was fluent. In 1897 when things simmered politically he returned from Leipzig to Belgrade.

On 17 April 1898, he was elected Bishop of Niš.

From 1901 to 1903 he was a member of the Senate of the Kingdom of Serbia.

As noted by the Russian consul A. K. Belyaev wrote:

Although the name of Bishop Nikanor (Ružičić) is connected with some controversial actions, where his useful activity was more noticeable. As Bishop of Niš, he published several volumes of his sermons and epistles. He published notes on his archpastoral trips and visits in the church press. He supported and strengthened the practice of conducting church chronicles, which were ultimately published. The manuscript "Chronicle of the Niš Cathedral" appeared during his administration of the Niš Episcopate.

A campaign was launched in the press to discredit Nikanor on charges of violating monastic vows and corruption. In addition, the fact that Bishop Nikanor was a Russian cadet cast a shadow over Russian spiritual education and gave rise to rumors that only weak cadres, unworthy of high spiritual titles and ecclesiastical authority, emerged from them. In 1911, he retired under this pressure.

He bequeathed all his property to the needs of enlightenment, and his books to the library of the Belgrade Theological Seminary

Nikanor Ružičić died on 16 October 1916 in Belgrade. After the founding of the Orthodox Theological Faculty of the University of Belgrade, his residence was turned into the first dormitory for students of this Serbian Seminary.

== Award and decorations ==
He was a recipient of multiple awards and decorations.

== Books and Essays ==
He was the author of numerous works on church themes. His theological works are based on research from old Russian manuscripts and texts, and his historical references are based on ancient Serbian sources. It is necessary to pay tribute to his diligence, as his works undoubtedly filled a gap in the Serbian scholarly literature and for a long time served as a necessary aid for the clergy and seminaries while lately, historians are also looking at his work.

The following works deserve the most mention:

- "Nomocanon on Marriage" (1880)
- "Nomocanon of the Serbian Church" (1882)
- "Table of kinship" (Table of kinship; 1886)
- "Mutual relations between the Serbian Church and the Patriarchate of Constantinople" (Mutual relations between the Serbian Church and the Constantinople Patriarchate), "Pastoral Epistles", "History of the Serbian Church" (I and II books, 1893 and 1895)
- (The Church Hierarchical Question in Serbia from the Canonical Point of View) ("Church Hierarchical Question in Serbia from the Canonical Point of View"; 1883)
- «Nemanja»
- «Das kirche Le religiose Leben bei Serben» (1896)

== Notes ==
- Ulyanovsky, 2019, p. 51.
- Radovan Pilipovic. Serbs in the Theological educational institutions of Russia in the second half of the XIX century – the opinion of the tsarist diplomat. // Русский Сборник. research on the history of Russia. research on the * * History of Russia. 2013. - C. 119
- Pilipovich, 2013, p. 99.
- Ulyanovsky, 2019, p. 52.

== Literature ==
- Bishop Sava Vuković: Serbian hierarchs from the ninth to the twentieth century, Euro – Belgrade, Unirex – Podgorica, Kalenic – Kr
