= Autonomous church =

Autonomous church may refer to:

- A self-governed church
- Sui iuris, groups in Catholicism
- Autonomy (Eastern Orthodoxy)

== See also ==
- Autocephaly
