= Cyril, Metropolitan of Belgrade =

Cyril (Greek: Κύριλλος / Kyrillos; Serbian: Кирил / Kiril) was an Eastern Orthodox Metropolitan of Belgrade, from 1825 to 1827. Since Belgrade was capital city of the Principality of Serbia, Cyril was the most senior Eastern Orthodox hierarch in the country. He belonged to the hierarchy of the Patriarchate of Constantinople and previously served as the Metropolitan of Mesembria.

== Biography ==
He was born in Kriva Palanka, in modern North Macedonia, and was educated in Constantinople. When the then Metropolitan of Belgrade Agathangelus was elected Metropolitan of Chalcedon in 1825, the Synod of Bishops in Constantinople elected Cyril as his successor in the Belgrade Diocese in August of the same year. The new Metropolitan of Belgrade cooperated closely with the Serbian Prince Miloš, but he was in poor health and died in Belgrade on 26 February 1827. In the same year, the Metropolitan Anthimus was elected in his place.

== Literature ==
- Ćirković, Sima (2004). The Serbs. Malden: Blackwell Publishing. ISBN 9781405142915.
- Kiminas, Demetrius (2009). The Ecumenical Patriarchate: A History of Its Metropolitanates with Annotated Hierarch Catalogs. Wildside Press LLC. ISBN 9781434458766.
- Pavlovich, Paul (1989). The History of the Serbian Orthodox Church. Serbian Heritage Books. ISBN 9780969133124.
- Popović, Radomir V. (2013). Serbian Orthodox Church in History. Belgrade: Academy of Serbian Orthodox Church for Fine Arts and Conservation. ISBN 9788686805621.
- Radić, Radmila (2007). "Serbian Christianity". The Blackwell Companion to Eastern Christianity. Malden, MA: Blackwell Publishing. pp. 231–248. ISBN 9780470766392.
- Radosavljević, Nedeljko V. (2017). "Antimus, Bishop of Vratsa and Lovech and Metropolitan of Belgrade" (PDF). Bulgarian Historical Review. 45 (1–2): 147–171.
- Radosavljević, Nedeljko V. (2018). "Belgrade Metropolitanate 1825–1831". Belgrade 1521-1867. Belgrade: The Institute of History. pp. 297–313. ISBN 9788677431327.
- Radosavljević, Nedeljko V. (2020). "Kyrillos, the Metropolitan of Belgrade (1825–1827)" (PDF). Bulgarian Historical Review. 48 (1–2): 73–93.

Eastern Orthodox Church titles
Preceded by Agathangelus	Metropolitan of Belgrade; 1825–1827	Succeeded by Anthimus
