= Monastery of St. Archangel Gabriel, Zemun =

Monastery in Serbia

Coordinates: 44°50′28.6″N 20°24′36.1″E

Monastery of Saint Archangel Gabriel
- Interactive map of Monastery of Saint Archangel Gabriel

Monastery information
- Order: Serbian Orthodox Church
- Established: 1990
- Archdiocese: Archdiocese of Belgrade and Karlovci

Site
- Location: Zemun municipality, Belgrade, Serbia

The Monastery of Saint Archangel Gabriel (Serbian: Манастир Светог Архангела Гаврила, romanized: Manastir Svetog Arhangela Gavrila), also known as the Zemun monastery (Serbian: Манастир Земун, romanized: Manastir Zemun) is a Serbian Orthodox monastery. Its church was built in 1786, on the site of an older church in the Donji Grad neighbourhood of Zemun (today part of Belgrade, Serbia). The monastery was officially established in 1990.

== History ==
The founder was Teodor–Toša Apostolović, the president of the Zemun ecclesiastical province. After the dismantling of the quarantine zone (kontumac) in 1842, the church lost its importance and by the second half of the 20th century, it was abandoned. In 1981, the abandoned church was used by then jeromonah (present Bishop) Filaret. On his behalf, the church was renovated, as the frescoes were destroyed and the church was used as a weapon cache. In 1990, protosinđel Filaret gained a permit to build a temple (cathedral) of 3,000 m2 on the site of the church, however, the following year, newly elected Serbian Patriarch Pavle declined.

== See also ==
- List of Serbian Orthodox monasteries
