= Anthimus, Metropolitan of Belgrade =

Anthimus (Greek: Άνθιμος, Serbian: Антим / Antim) was Eastern Orthodox Metropolitan of Belgrade from 1827 until 1831.

== Biography ==
Anthimus was born on the island of Andros around 1780. He was ordained a bishop in Constantinople. He was the bishop of Vratsa from 1804 to 1813, and then from 1813 to 1827 the bishop of Lovech, both within the Trnovo metropolitanate in Bulgaria, which was under the jurisdiction of the Patriarchate of Constantinople. There he was the bishop of Lovech, and he was called Anthimus II, because he inherited the seat of the bishop of the same name.

In the period from 1827 to 1831, Anthimus was the Metropolitan of Belgrade. He succeeded Metropolitan Cyril, who died the same year. Anthimus came to Serbia in August 1827. He was also the last Phanariot Greek to head the Metropolitanate of Belgrade, as the Sultan's Hatt-i humayun gave Serbs the right to "freedom of religion so that they could elect their own Serbian metropolitan instead of the Greek Phanariot." He anointed Prince Miloš Obrenović as the new Serbian ruler in December 1830 in the Orthodox Cathedral in Belgrade.

He was the head of the Belgrade metropolitanate until the election of Melentije Pavlović in 1831, who became the first Serb to head the renewed Metropolitanate of Belgrade. Then, Anthimus voluntarily withdrew from his diocese. He left Belgrade on 21 October 1831.

He first settled in Constantinople, and then in Athens, where he died.

== Literature ==
- Ćirković, Sima (2004). The Serbs. Malden: Blackwell Publishing.
- Kiminas, Demetrius (2009). The Ecumenical Patriarchate: A History of Its Metropolitanates with Annotated Hierarch Catalogs. Wildside Press LLC.
- Pavlovich, Paul (1989). The History of the Serbian Orthodox Church. Serbian Heritage Books.
- Popović, Radomir V. (2013). Serbian Orthodox Church in History. Belgrade: Academy of Serbian Orthodox Church for Fine Arts and Conservation. ISBN 978-86-86805-62-1.
- Radić, Radmila (2007). "Serbian Christianity". The Blackwell Companion to Eastern Christianity. Malden, MA: Blackwell Publishing. pp. 231–248. ISBN 978-0-470-76639-2.
- Radosavljević, Nedeljko V. (2017). "Antimus, Bishop of Vratsa and Lovech and Metropolitan of Belgrade" (PDF). Bulgarian Historical Review. 45 (1–2): 147–171.
- Radosavljević, Nedeljko V. (2018). "Belgrade Metropolitanate 1825–1831". Belgrade 1521-1867. Belgrade: The Institute of History. pp. 297–313. ISBN 978-86-7743-132-7.
- Radosavljević, Nedeljko V. (2020). "Kyrillos, the Metropolitan of Belgrade (1825–1827)" (PDF). Bulgarian Historical Review. 48 (1–2): 73–93.

Eastern Orthodox Church titles
Preceded by Cyril	Metropolitan of Belgrade; 1827–1831	Succeeded by Melentije
