= Teodosije Mraović =

Serbian Metropolitan

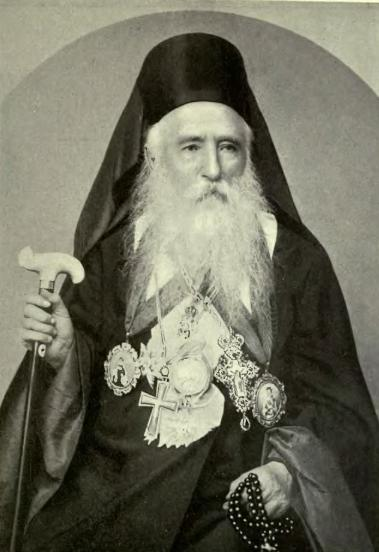
Teodosije Mraović

Teodosije Mraović (1815–1891) was the Metropolitan of the Eastern Orthodox Church in the Kingdom of Serbia from 1883 to 1889. Mraović was a hierarch of the Metropolitanate of Karlovci before moving to Serbia in 1843, and eventually taking over the post of the sacked Metropolitan of Belgrade Mihailo Jovanović.

== Biography ==
Teodosije studied philosophy in Budapest and theology at Sremski Karlovci and entered a monastic order at the Rakovica Monastery, near Belgrade. As there were no bishops in Serbia proper willing to consecrate him as the Metropolitan, he was forced to return to northern Serbian lands, then under Austrian rule, in Sremski Karlovci, where patriarch German Anđelić, with the express approval of the Austrian Emperor, performed the necessary rites. The Serbian bishops were subsequently replaced with new appointees: another professor of the Belgrade Seminary, Nestor, born in Kragujevac, was appointed Bishop of Niš; the Sremski Karlovci born archimandrite of the Hopovo Monastery, Samuilo, was sent to Šabac while Kornelije (Cornelius), the administrator of the Ravanica Monastery, in Serbia, was elevated to the Bishopric of Užice. As far as the deposed Metropolitan Mihailo Jovanović was concerned, this new Church administration, unlawfully elected and appointed, was uncanonical according to Serbian ecclesiastical law (Zakonopravilo) despite the blessing given by the Ecumenical Patriarch in Constantinople in 1884. By then (1884), the Bishop of Niš, Nestor, died. He was replaced by Dimitrije Pavlović, while the Eparchy of Užice was renamed the Eparchy of Žiča with its seat in Čačak. The bishop of Šabac, Samuilo, died in 1886, and at that point, the Eparchy of Šabac was added to the Belgrade Metropolia, while the Eparchy of Negotin was simply abolished. By 1886 Serbia was divided into only three dioceses—Belgrade, Niš, and Žiča.

The whole period of Prince Milan Obrenović's rule of Serbia was an extremely trying time for the country, the people, and the Serbian Orthodox Church in particular. His predecessor, Russian-educated Metropolitan Mihailo Jovanović, sacked for being pro-Russian by the Serbian government that favored Austrian rapprochement instead. returned in 1889 and harmony in the church was brought back.

Metropolitan Teodosije (Mraović) and his bishops were all secret admirers of Metropolitan Mihailo (Jovanović), and they readily gave up their appointments in the interest of the restoration and normalization in the life of the Church. Also, Teodosije advised his bishops to tell their subordinate clergy to stay above politics, and remain only God's servants.

== See also ==
- Mihailo Jovanović
- Petar Jovanović
- Melentije Pavlović
- Inokentije Pavlović
