= Inokentije Pavlović =

Serbian Metropolitan

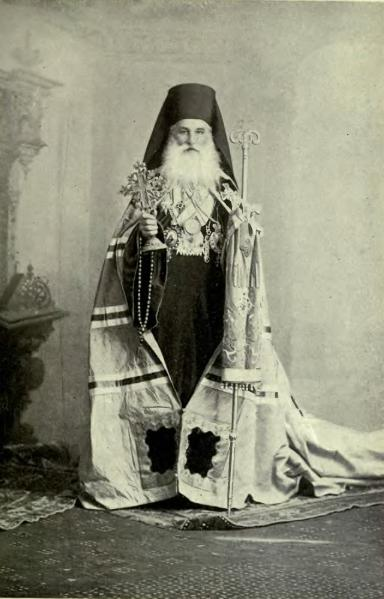
Inokentije Pavlović

Inokentije Pavlović (baptised as Jakov Pavlović; 1 August 1840 – 19 May 1905) was the Metropolitan of Belgrade, head of the Serbian Orthodox Church in the Kingdom of Serbia from 1898 until his death in 1905. He is the father of war artist Dragoljub Pavlović (1875–1956) and Chetnik freedom-fighter Aleksandar "Aca" Pavlović who died in the Macedonian Struggle on 27 July 1907 in Kučevište.

== Biography ==
=== Early life ===
He was born as the son of protoiereus and political activist Jovan Pavlović. In his hometown of Šabac, he graduated from elementary school and four middle school grades. Then he went to Belgrade, where for two years he studied in the seminary (Bogoslovija). He continued his seminar course in Kyiv, where he also graduated from the Theological Academy. In 1863 he returned to Serbia and on July 31 of the same year, he was ordained presbyter as a married cleric. In the years 1864–1870 he was a military chaplain in Kragujevac and a lecturer at the First Kragujevac Gymnasium. In 1870 he became a professor of the Belgrade seminary and in January 1871 he became its rector. In 1877 he was transferred to the position of catechist of the higher female school in Belgrade, at the same time being a priest of the court. In the years 1880–1886 he was the head of the church department at the Ministry of Education and Church Affairs. In 1886 he returned to the post of rector of the Belgrade seminary and remained there until 1893 when he retired. A year earlier, his wife died. After the loss of spouse, he took religious vows, accepting religious name Inkoentije (Innocent).

=== Bishop and metropolitan ===
On 1 August 1894, he was nominated as the Bishop of Niš and a day later ordained. Four years later, after death of the Metropolitan of Belgrade Mihailo Jovanović, by the will of the King Alexander I Obrenović he became the new Metropolitan of Belgrade. The King's decision was determined by the fact that he was educated in the Russian Empire, which, according to the King, would allow him to win the favour for the Orthodox Church in the Kingdom of Serbia.

Inokentije's tenure as Metropolitan saw the marriage of King Alexander I Obrenović with Draga Mašin in 1900, the assassination of the royal couple in the May Coup in 1903 (staged by the Black Hand, a group of the Royal Serbian Army officers) and subsequent installment of Peter I Karađorđević as the new King of Serbia.

Although Inokentije was a thoroughly educated man, he did not leave any more extensive work behind. He only published articles on the subject of theology and pedagogy in various journals, and regularly preached. He wrote 250 homilies, however, only some of them were printed.

He was awarded Order of Saint Sava and Order of Miloš the Great.

== Sources ==
- Đ. Slijepčević,Istorija Srpske Pravoslavne Crkve, t. II, JRJ, Beograd 2002.

Eastern Orthodox Church titles
Preceded by Jeronim Jovanović	Serbian Bishop of Niš; 1894–1898	Succeeded by Nikanor Ružičić
Preceded by Mihailo Jovanović	Serbian Metropolitan of Belgrade; 1898–1905	Succeeded by Dimitrije Pavlović
