= Gavrilo Popović =

Bishop of Šabac

Gavrilo Popović or Bishop Gavrilo (Saint George Popović; 23 October 1811 – 7 February 1871) was Bishop of Šabac, Rector of Lyceum and the catechist of Belgrade.

== Biography ==
He finished elementary school and a six-year course at the high school in Baja. He completed his philosophy in Szeged and Győr, the seventh and eighth grades of high school. He began his law studies in Pest, but after one year of study, he decided to move to Sremski Karlovci to study theology instead. He completed his seminary in Sremski Karlovci, and then, at the invitation of Belgrade Metropolitan Peter, moved to Serbia in 1834. In the same year, he became a deacon and worked as a clerk in the metropolitan area. In 1835 he was elevated to proto-deacon.

A seminary was founded in Belgrade in 1836 and Gavrilo became a professor of the newly-established Belgrade seminary. He remained in that service until 1839. From 1839 he was named professor at the Lyceum with five others (Aleksije Okolski, Atanasije Teodorović, Isidor Stojanović, Atanasije Nikolić, Konstantin Branković) in Kragujevac, then the capital of Serbia. The same Lyceum was transferred from Kragujevac to Belgrade (once the city was liberated) in 1841, and Gavrilo moved to Belgrade consequently. He remained in that teaching position until May 1844.

From 11 June 1842, he was a regular member of the Society Of Serbian Letters. He was Vice-President of the society in 1848, 1855 and 1856, and its Secretary in 1850.

In May 1844 he was dismissed as the rector of the Lyceum and a member of the Consistory for some transgression that has yet to be made known.

On 25 November 1860, he was appointed Bishop of Šabac. He wrote and published a Serbian premier in 1864 called Bukvar for the grade schools. He also wrote educational children's stories and other textbooks.

He retired on November 27, 1866 and after that lived for a time in the Ravanica Monastery and the Bukovo monastery.

From 6 February 1869, he was appointed an honorary member of the Serbian Learned Society on 29 June 1864. He was a full member of the Philological and Philosophical Section.

When he became seriously ill, he came to live with his friend and relative, Theodosius Mraović, in Belgrade in 1870. He died 7 February 1871 in Belgrade.
