= Dimitrije, Serbian Patriarch =

Patriarch of the Serbian Orthodox Church from 1920 to 1930

His Holiness Dimitrije
- Archbishop of Peć, Metropolitan of Belgrade and Karlovci, and Serbian Patriarch
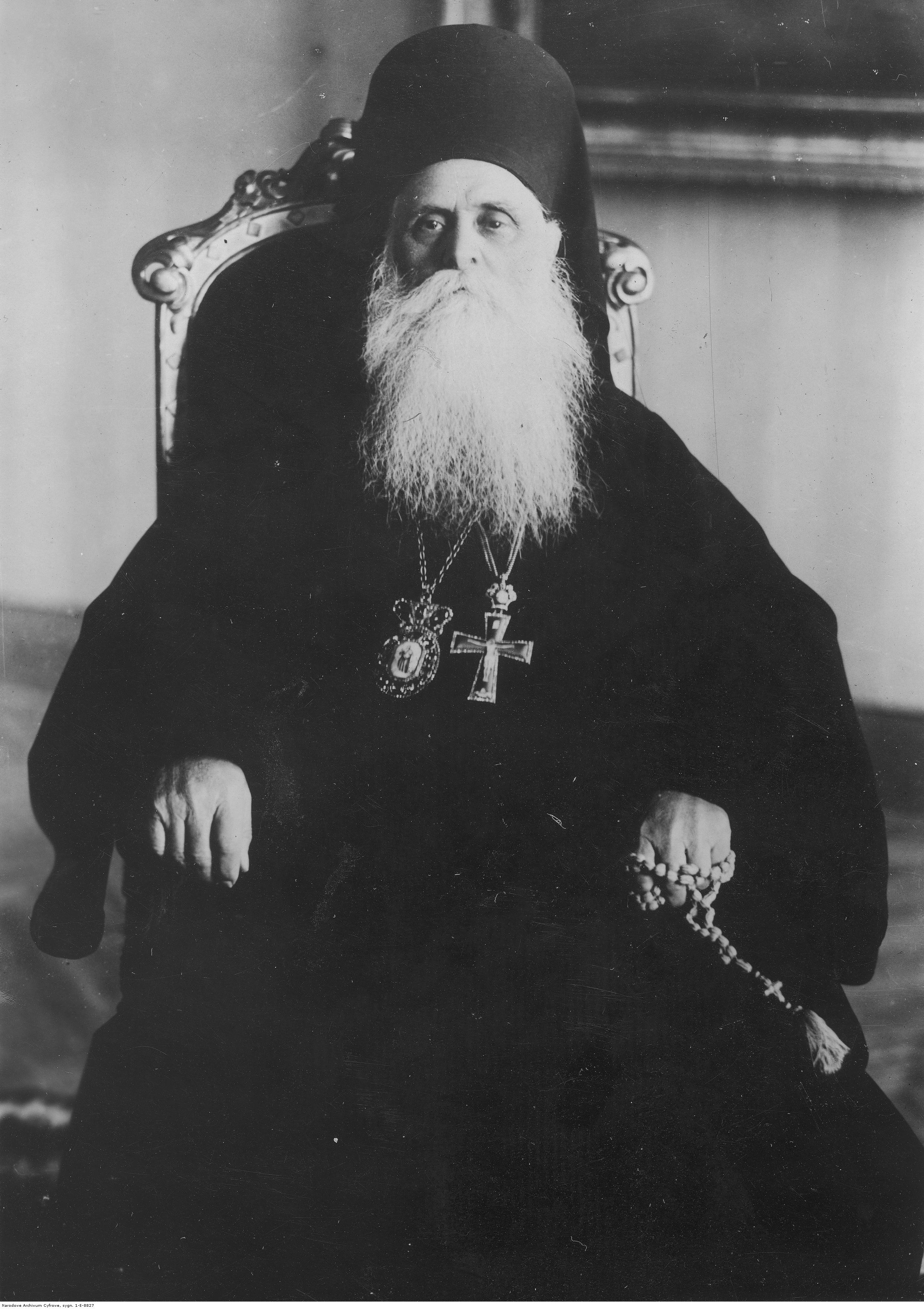
- Church: Serbian Orthodox Church
- See: Belgrade
- Installed: 12 September 1920
- Term ended: 6 April 1930
- Predecessor: Kalinik II
- Successor: Varnava

Orders
- Ordination: 1878
- Consecration: 1884

Personal details
- Born: 28 October 1846 Požarevac, Principality of Serbia
- Died: 6 April 1930 Belgrade, Kingdom of Yugoslavia

Styles of Serbian Patriarch Dimitrije I
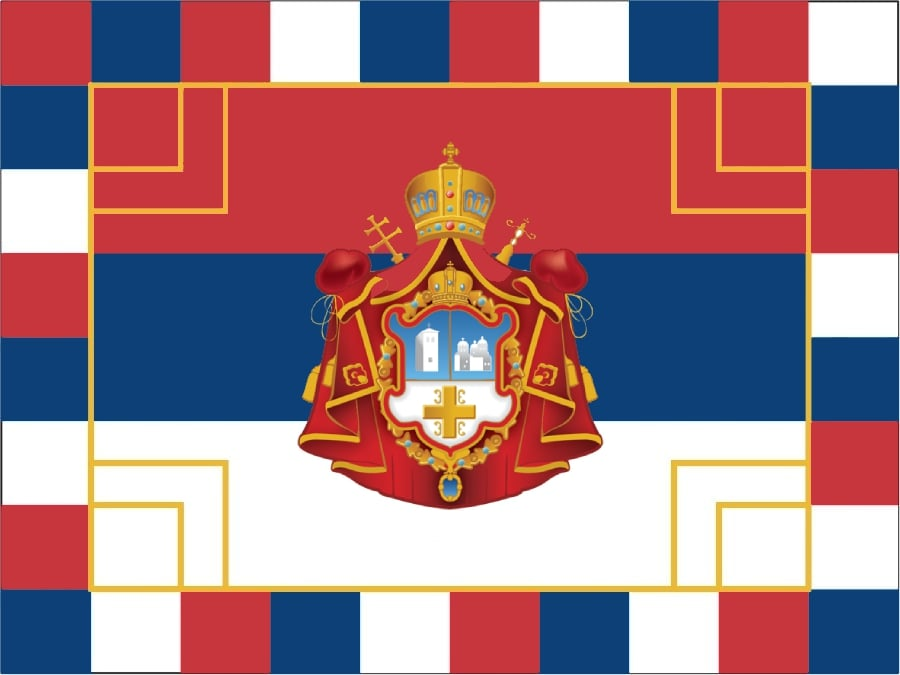
- Reference style: His Holiness
- Spoken style: Your Holiness
- Religious style: Patriarch
- Posthumous style: His Holiness Patriarch Dimitrije I of Blessed Repose

Dimitrije (Serbian: Димитрије, English: Demetrius; born Dimitrije Pavlović; 28 October 1846 – 6 April 1930) was the 39th Serbian Patriarch and the first Patriarch of the reunified Serbian Orthodox Church, serving from 1920 until his death in 1930. He was appointed Bishop of Niš in 1884 and held that post until 1889. He became Bishop of Šabac and Valjevo in 1898 and held that post until 1905. When Inokentije, Metropolitan of Belgrade, died in 1905, Dimitrije was appointed the successor. In 1920, the Serbian Patriarchate was re-established, thus Dimitrije became the first head of the re-established patriarchate. On 8 June 1922, he wed King Alexander I and Princess Maria of Romania in the Cathedral of Saint Archangel Michael in Belgrade. Patriarch Dimitrije died on 6 April 1930 in Belgrade and was buried at the Rakovica monastery.

He was decorated Order of Saint Sava and Albanian Order of Skanderbeg for his help for Albanian Orthodox Church.

== See also ==
- List of heads of the Serbian Orthodox Church
- List of 20th-century religious leaders

Eastern Orthodox Church titles
Vacant Title last held by Kalinik II	Serbian Patriarch; 1920–1930	Succeeded by Varnava
Preceded by Inokentije Pavlović	Metropolitan of Belgrade; 1905–1920	Vacant Merged into the Serbian Orthodox Church

== Sources ==
- Слијепчевић, Ђоко М. (1966). Историја Српске православне цркве. Vol. књ. 2. Минхен: Искра.
- Слијепчевић, Ђоко М. (1986). Историја Српске православне цркве. Vol. књ. 3. Келн: Искра.
- Вуковић, Сава (1996). Српски јерарси од деветог до двадесетог века (Serbian Hierarchs from the 9th to the 20th Century). Београд: Евро.
