= Mojsije Veresić =

Mojsije
- Administrator of the Archdiocese of Belgrade and Metropolitan See of Serbia
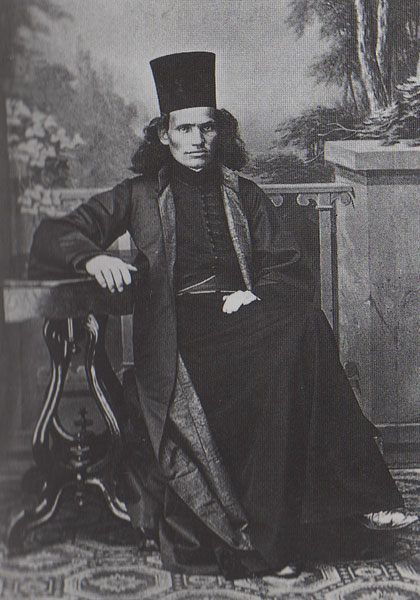
- Mojsije Veresić, circa 1865
- Native name: Мојсије
- Church: Serbian Orthodox Church
- Diocese: Metropolitanate of Belgrade
- Appointed: 18 October 1881
- Term ended: 6 April 1883
- Predecessor: Mihailo Jovanović
- Successor: Teodosije Mraović

Orders
- Consecration: 14 September 1868

Personal details
- Born: Maksim Veresić; 1835 Stragari, Principality of Serbia (modern-day Serbia)
- Died: 16 October 1896 (aged 60–61) Belgrade, Kingdom of Serbia (modern-day Serbia)
- Denomination: Eastern Orthodoxy
- Education: Kiev Theological Academy

Mojsije Veresić (1835 – 4 October 1896) was a Bishop of Negotin who was appointed by the Cabinet of Milan Piroćanac as the administrator of the metropolitanate of Belgrade after the sacking of Metropolitan Mihailo Jovanović in 1881. In 1883, he was replaced by Teodosije Mraović. The early 1880s was a period in Serbia called the "Church Crisis" which lasted until 1889 when Mihailo Jovanović was elected Metropolitan for the second time.

== Life and work ==
Mojsije was born in Stragari in the Kragujevac district as Maksim Veresić to parents Jovan and Stana Veresić. Upon completion of elementary school, he was admitted to the monastery of the Annunciation Monastery at Rudnik. It was there that Archimandrite Vasily, the head of the monastery, encouraged him to study theology.

Sometime later he was elevated to deacon by the bishop Mihailo Jovanović of Šabac. The bishop then sent him to Imperial Russia to study at the Kiev Theological Academy. After graduation, he was appointed a clerk of the Belgrade Consistory in 1862.

In August 1866, he was appointed a professor of theology. In 1867 he was named the head of the monastery of Drača, near Kragujevac. Again in 1868 he was returned back to his chair as professor of theology and elevated to the monastic rank of archimandrite.

After the resignation of Bishop Gavrilo of Šabac, Mojsije took his place as Bishop of Šabac in September 1868. In February 1869 he became a Corresponding Member of the Serbian Learned Society.

In June 1880, he was returned to active service as Bishop of Negotin.

When Metropolitan Mihailo Jovanović of Serbia was overthrown in 1881, the Serbian government-appointed Bishop Mojsije as an administrator of the Metropolitanate of Belgrade. It was a difficult period when the Serbian government sought to control and subjugate the church to its Austrophilic policies. The Serbian Bishops' Council was dissolved and its members tried in vain to persuade the Serbian government to divert from this harmful path of dealing with the church. The Serbian government knew that the Bishops' Council would not select a suitable candidate for them, so they imposed a special body for the election of the metropolitan, who then elected the metropolitan Teodosije Mraović in 1883. Mojsije did not respond to the calls of the new metropolitan, deeming him illegitimate, and all his acts as invalid. Although the new Metropolitan Teodosije included Mojsije in the structure of his hierarchy, Bishop Mojsije refused to cooperate with him. He was fined twice by the Serbian government for insubordination. Shortly afterward he was dismissed in April 1883.

Mojsije was an honorary member of the Serbian Royal Academy since November 1892.

He died as a state counsellor in Belgrade on 16 October 1896 and was originally buried in the old Mark's Church in Belgrade. During World War II, his remains were transferred to the crypt of the new Mark Church.
