= Mihailo Jovanović (metropolitan) =

Metropolitan of Serbia

Mihailo
- Archbishop of Belgrade and Metropolitan of Serbia
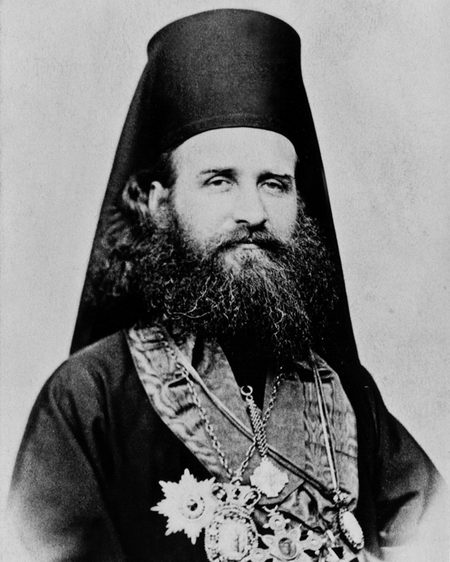
- Metropolitan Mihailo, c. 1865.
- Native name: Михаило
- Church: Serbian Orthodox Church
- Diocese: Metropolitanate of Belgrade
- In office: 1859–1881; 1889–1898
- Predecessor: Petar Jovanović; Teodosije Mraović
- Successor: Mojsije Veresić; Inokentije Pavlović

Personal details
- Born: Miloje Jovanović; 19 August 1826 Sokobanja, Principality of Serbia (modern-day Serbia)
- Died: 17 February 1898 (aged 71) Belgrade, Kingdom of Serbia (modern-day Serbia)
- Denomination: Eastern Orthodoxy
- Education: Kiev Theological Academy

Mihailo Jovanović (Serbian: Михаило Јовановић; 19 August 1826 – 17 February 1898) was the Metropolitan of Belgrade from 1859 to 1881 and again from 1889 until his death in 1898.

Mihailo's time in office was marked with modernization in church management and in the education of priests. During his tenure, the Metropolitanate of Belgrade was awarded autocephaly from the Ecumenical Patriarchate of Constantinople, following the Serbian–Turkish Wars of 1876 to 1878.

Politically, Mihailo was a convinced Russophile and maintained numerous close ties with Pan-Slavic circles in the Austrian and Russian Empires. For this reason, he came into conflict with the Austrophile Prince Milan Obrenović, sparking the so-called Church Question (Serbian: Црквено питање) which eventually led to a drastic cooling of relations between Serbia and Russia. Mihailo was removed from his position of Metropolitan in 1881, living in exile in Bulgaria and Russia from 1883 to 1889, only returning after Milan Obrenović had abdicated.

His full title was the Archbishop of Belgrade and Metropolitan of Serbia.

== Early life and education ==
Mihailo was born Miloje Jovanović on 19 August 1826 in Sokobanja to Milovan and Marija Jovanović. He attended elementary school at his hometown, and studied gymnasium in Zaječar and Negotin. In Negotin, he studied under Dositej Novaković. He enrolled at the Belgrade Seminary in 1842 and graduated in 1846.

At the initiative of Metropolitan Petar Jovanović, he went to Kiev in July 1846 with six friends under the leadership of Sima Milutinović Sarajlija. There, he graduated from the Theological Academy with a master's degree. He was tonsured a monk on 29 March 1853 in the Kiev Pechersk Lavra and was given the name Mihailo. He became a hierodeacon on 12 April and a hieromonk on 16 April. After completing his studies, Mihailo stayed in Russia for almost another year, where he visited Moscow, St. Petersburg and the Optina Monastery near Kozelsk and studied the life of Russian monks.

In June 1854, Mihailo returned to Serbia and became a teacher at the Seminary, where he stayed until October when he became archimandrite of Studenica Monastery. On 14 October 1854 he was ordained Bishop of Šabac.

== Metropolitan of Belgrade ==
On 25 July 1859, he succeeded Petar Jovanović as the Metropolitan of Belgrade. Petar had defected to Austria because of political differences.

Mihailo's time in office was marked with modernization in church management and in the education of priests. He oversaw a new church law on 30 September 1862 which modernized the ecclesiastical apparatus, and on 27 September 1863 a law was passed which modernized teaching at the seminary. In 1873, a separate department was opened at the Belgrade seminary for the training of priests that were to proselytize in areas that were still part of the Ottoman Empire. According to the law of 11 January 1896, training in the seminary lasted nine years.

Mihailo also laid the foundations of the discipline of theology in Serbia. He was particularly interested in dogmatic problems and practical theology. His works on Serbian church history, “Pravoslavna srbska crkva u Knjažestvu Srbii” (The Orthodox Serbian Church in the Principality of Serbia, 1874) and “Pravoslavna crkva u Kraljevini Srbiji” (The Orthodox Church in the Kingdom of Serbia, 1895) are also of interest. Within the church, he separated administration from the judiciary, improved the training of clergy and promoted the monasteries.

Mihailo was a convinced Russophile and maintained numerous close ties with Pan-Slavic circles in the Russian Empire, and gathered various figures interested in the unification of the South Slavs, including Josip Juraj Strossmayer, but also many Bosnian Franciscans, which made him very unpopular in Vienna. During the Herzegovina Uprising of 1875, Mihailo helped the insurgents materially and politically, and Pan-Slavic committees sent their help for the insurgents through him.

During the Serbian–Turkish War of 1878, Mihailo advocated for the autocephaly of the Metropolitanate of Belgrade, as well as the Bulgarian Exarchate, arguing that an additional autonomous metropolitanate should be created from Ottoman areas under the Serbian Patriarchate of Peć before 1766, including the Eparchy of Kyustendil, also claimed by the Bulgarian Exarchate. Between the Treaty of San Stefano and the Congress of Berlin, Mihailo advocated for the autocephaly of Bosnian eparchies and the autonomy of eparchies that were to stay under Ottoman rule. On 20 October 1879, the Metropolitanate of Belgrade gained autocephaly in agreement with the Ecumenical Patriarchate of Constantinople.

He was an honorary member of two universities in Saint Petersburg and Moscow, from 1869 and 1871, respectively. Mihailo was also active in fighting for humanitarian causes. In 1862, he became the president of the Society for the Freedom of the African Slaves. In February 1876, he became the first president of Red Cross of Serbia.

== Dismissal and exile ==
Mihailo was active in Serbian politics and sympathized with the Liberal Party of Jovan Ristić. He sharply condemned the occupation of Bosnia and Herzegovina by Austria-Hungary in 1878, as well as the Austrophile policies of Prince Milan Obrenović. Another point of contention was Mihailo's refusal to divorce Milan from his wife, Princess Natalie. Because of all this, he fell out of favor with Milan Piroćanac's Progressive government and was deposed on 18 October 1881 under the new law on taxes, which the then Minister of Education Stojan Novaković had enacted and which also affected the Church. The law was amended in 1882, allowing the government to pack the synod with its own lay delegates, whereby the state had effectively taken over the church, reducing it to something akin to a state agency. The so-called Church Question (Serbian: Црквено питање) eventually led to a drastic cooling of relations between Serbia and Russia.

On 11 April 1883, Mihailo left Serbia, headed for Istanbul. His trip was financed by the Russian consul Alexander Ivanovich Persiani. Shortly after stopping on the Bosphorus, he visited Palestine. Mihailo spent two months at Hilandar. He spent time in Bulgaria, initially in Varna, later moving to Ruse. He was forced to leave most of his stops due to pressure from the Serbian government. In the summer of 1884, Mihailo was allowed to enter Russia, leaving for Kiev on 28 August, where he again stayed at the Pechersk Lavra.

During the next five years, Mihailo moved between Kiev and Moscow where he became a gathering point for the Radicals who emigrated to Russia during the rule of Milan Obrenović. In the eyes of both the Russian government and the ecclesiastical and Pan-Slavic circles, Mihailo became a martyr for the Slavic and Orthodox cause.

Mihailo met the Radical leader Nikola Pašić, exiled for his role in the Timok Rebellion, in December 1883 en route from Silistra to Istanbul, when they agreed on a general plan of cooperation against the Serbian ruler. During their second meeting between May and June 1884, they agreed on an armed insurrection in August 1884, with a back-up plan involving the assassination of Milan Obrenović using a hand grenade. The logistics were to be carried out by Nicolas Notovitch. The plan never came to fruition since the Russian leadership at the time was wary of Pašić, who they considered a "nihilist and rebel", and Notovitch revealed the plan to Interior Minister Stojan Novaković in Belgrade and Serbian envoy Jovan Marinović in Paris. Because of their suspicion of Metropolitan Mihailo's plans of insurrection, fearing a destabilization of Bulgaria, he was allowed to move to Russia in May 1884, but was not allowed to settle in Moscow, the center of the Pan-Slavic movement, instead initially settling in Kiev.

In Kiev, Mihailo came into contact with several high-ranking Slavophile figures, including Ivan Aksakov, who would eventually prove to be the central figure promoting Mihailo's and Pašić's plans of armed insurrection. The insurrection was supposed to start in September 1885, but was delayed by the unification of Bulgaria in September and the ensuing Serbo-Bulgarian War in November 1885. Pašić fled to Russia, where a meeting was set up between Mihailo, Aksakov and General Mikhail Chernyayev in Moscow, where Mihailo had recently moved. The plan they agreed on was never realized because of the general amnesty proclaimed for rebels of the Timok Rebellion, as well as the death of Ivan Aksakov in February 1886. In the spring of 1886, Mihailo again moved to Kiev. Plans were made for a joint attack against Serbia with the Montenegrin Prince Nikola Petrović-Njegoš in the summer of 1886, but were never realized.

== Return to Serbia and death ==
When King Milan abdicated in 1889, Mihailo was able to return to Serbia and was reinstated as Metropolitan of Belgrade on 28 May 1889, which he then held until his death. This, in the end, did not reinvigorate the church's power after it had been subordinated by the state. The new law on ecclesiastical organization promulgated in 1890 affirmed the increased influence of state authorities in the selection of the Metropolitan as well as justices of the ecclesiastical court.

Mihailo remained the Metropolitan of Belgrade until his death in 1898, during the reign of Milan's son King Alexander I. He was buried in Belgrade's Cathedral, the Saborna crkva.

== Gallery ==
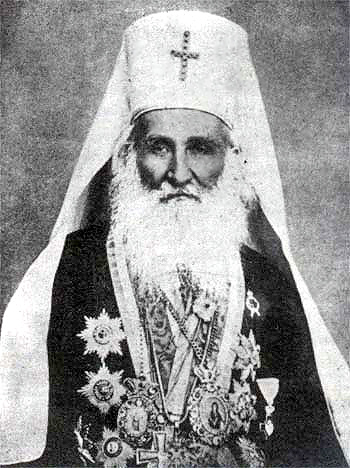
Portrait of Mihailo Jovanović

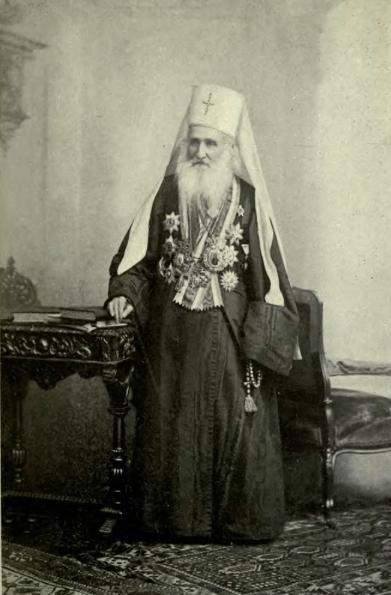
Portrait of Mihailo Jovanović

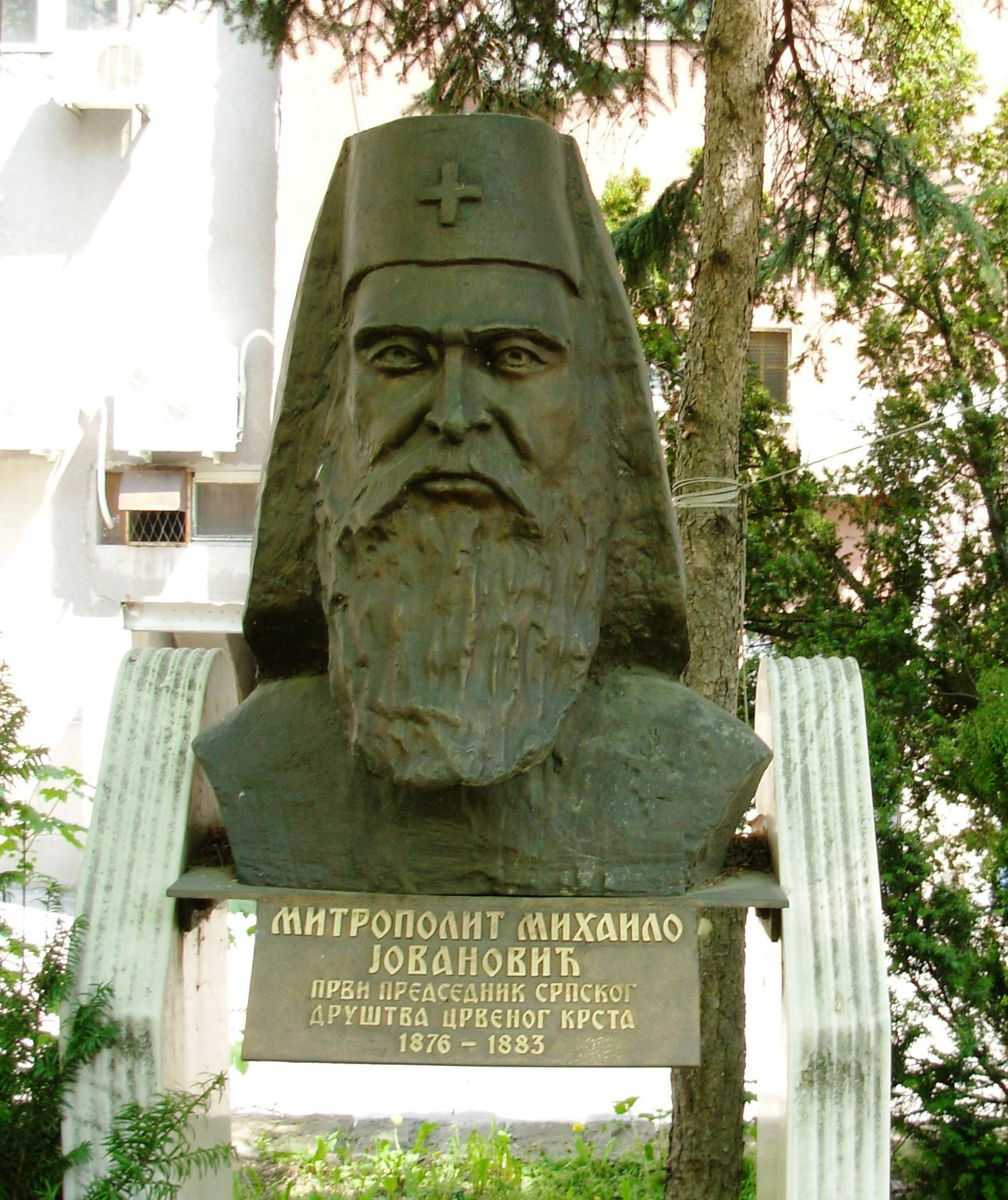
Bust of Mihailo Jovanović in the courtyard of the Red Cross of Serbia

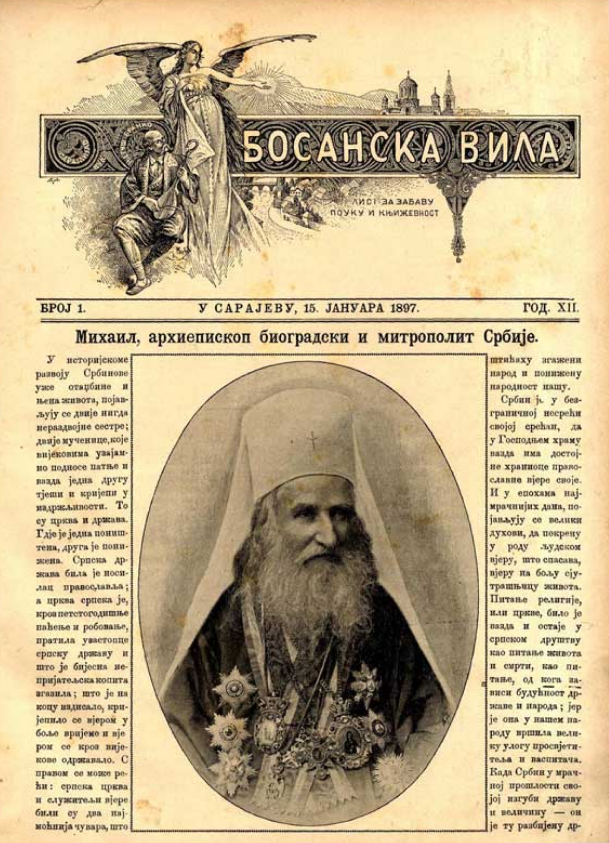
Front page of the Sarajevo-based Bosnian Serb literary magazine Bosanska vila (Bosnian fairy) on 15 January 1897, depicting Metropolitan Mihailo.

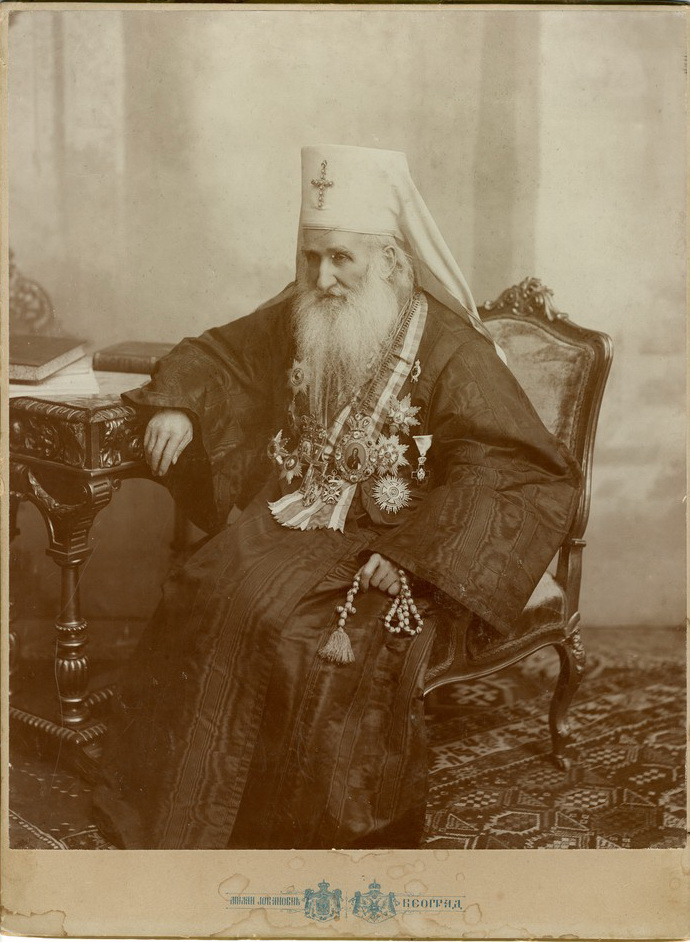
Photograph of Mihailo Jovanović by Milan Jovanović, 1895.

== Works ==
Metropolitan Mihailo authored publications about church history:

- Pravoslavna crkva u Kneževini Srbiji (Orthodox Church in the Principality of Serbia, published in 1874)
- Pravoslavna crkva u Kraljevini Srbiji (Orthodox Church in the Kingdom of Serbia, published in 1895)

Eastern Orthodox Church titles
Preceded by Joanikije Nešković	Serbian Bishop of Šabac; 1854–1859	Succeeded by Gavrilo Popović
Preceded by Petar Jovanović	Serbian Metropolitan of Belgrade; 1859–1881	Succeeded by Mojsije Veresić
Preceded by Teodosije Mraović	Serbian Metropolitan of Belgrade; 1889–1898	Succeeded by Inokentije Pavlović
