= Bukovo monastery =

Monastery in Serbia

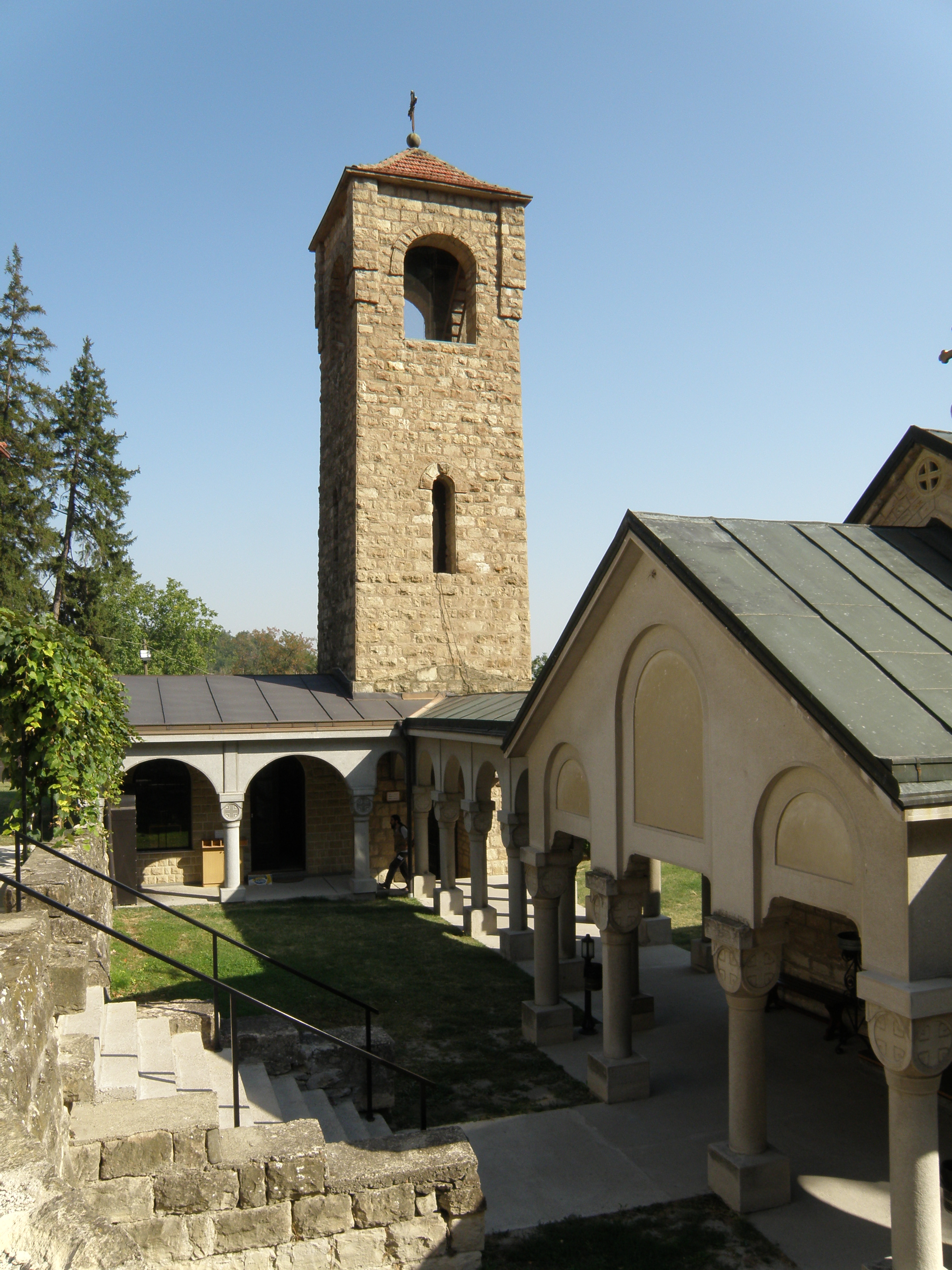
- Bukovo monastery
- Interactive map of Bukovo monastery

Monastery information
- Full name: Манастир Буково
- Order: Serbian Orthodox
- Established: 14th century
- Controlled churches: Miloševo church

People
- Founder: Stefan Milutin

Site
- Location: Negotin, Serbia
- Coordinates: 44.2159°N 22.4928°E

The Bukovo Monastery (Serbian: Манастир Буково, romanized: Manastir Bukovo) is a late 13th- or early 14th century Serbian Orthodox monastery on the slopes of Bratujevac in Negotin, Serbia, founded by Serbian king Stefan Milutin (1282–1321) of the House of Nemanjić. Other sources state that, according to legend, it was founded by Nikodim I. It is surrounded by woods at the hill of Bratujevac, the frescoes in the monastery includes the Holy Mother in a circle of angels and Saint Michael. The bell was donated by Serbian Prince Miloš Obrenović (1815–1839) in the 1830s. Renovation was made in 1902; painting by Steva Todorović in the Romantic style, frescoes by Milisav Marković.

== See also ==
- List of Serbian Orthodox monasteries
