= Petar Jovanović (metropolitan) =

Metropolitan of Belgrade

Petar
- Archbishop of Belgrade and Metropolitan of Serbia
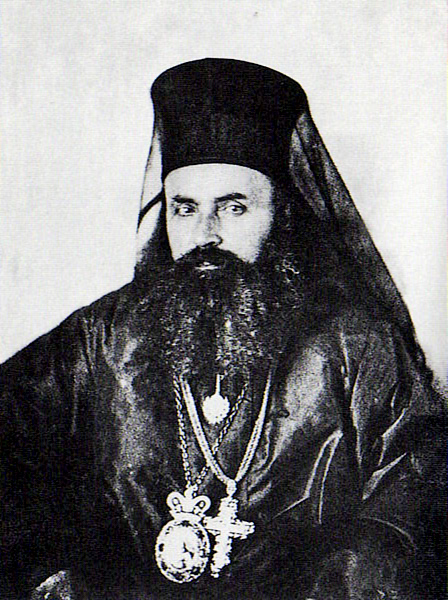
- Metropolitan Petar, by Anastas Jovanović (c. 1850)
- Native name: Петар
- Church: Serbian Orthodox Church
- Diocese: Metropolitanate of Belgrade
- In office: 1833–1859
- Predecessor: Melentije Pavlović
- Successor: Mihailo Jovanović
- Other post: Bishop of Gornji Karlovac (1859–1864)

Orders
- Ordination: October 1833 by Bishop of Užice Nikifor Maksimović
- Consecration: 6 December 1833 by Ecumenical Patriarch of Constantinople Constantius I

Personal details
- Born: 18 February 1800 Ilok, Kingdom of Croatia (modern-day Croatia)
- Died: 23 September 1864 (aged 64) Sremski Karlovci, Austrian Empire (modern-day Serbia)
- Denomination: Eastern Orthodoxy
- Education: Karlovci Gymnasium; Clerical High School of Saint Arsenije

Petar Jovanović (baptised as Pavle Jovanović; 18 February 1800 in Ilok – 22 September 1864 in Sremski Karlovci) was the Metropolitan of Belgrade, head of the Serbian Orthodox Church in the Principality of Serbia from 1833 until 1859.

== Biography ==
=== Early life ===
Born in Ilok (present-day Croatia), he graduated from the Karlovci Gymnasium and the Clerical High School of Saint Arsenije in Sremski Karlovci. Then he studied philosophy in Szeged. After graduating in 1819, he became a teacher at the Karlovci Gymnasium. In 1830 he went to Serbia to become secretary of the Metropolitan of Belgrade Melentije Pavlović, and at the same time secretary of the Supreme National Court, and then personal secretary of the Prince Miloš Obrenović. He was a married man; his wife died shortly after they moved to Serbia.

=== Election as Metropolitan ===
After the death of Metropolitan Melentije in 1833, Prince Miloš offered Pavle Jovanović the office of the Metropolitan of Belgrade, after he refused the first candidate he considered, Metropolitan of Caesarea Cappadocia Gerasimos. Miloš wanted the Serb to be the new head of the newly established Metropolis. Before taking his religious vows and receiving priestly and episcopal ordination, he demanded that the Prince promise that the secular authorities would not interfere in the affairs of the Church, in particular, that the priests would not be tried by ordinary courts, but by bishops. In October 1833, he took his religious vows in front of the Bishop Nikifor Maksimović of the Eparchy of Užice. In the following days he was ordained successively to deacon and presbyter, then he was given the dignity of archimandrite. On 20 September 1833, he was already archimandrite at the court of Prince Miloš in Kragujevac. On 6 December 1833, he was consecrated as bishop by the Ecumenical Patriarch of Constantinople Constantius I. He returned to Serbia before Christmas (which fell on 7 January 1834, according to the Julian calendar).

=== Metropolitan ===
Petar Jovanović had a solid general and theological education, so he was especially involved in the organization of schools for the clergy. He created in 1834 metropolitan seminary textbooks and invited lecturers from abroad, talented students were directed to religious schools in the Russian Empire. In 1834–1835, he created a metropolitan consistory in Belgrade and acted to adopt the internal statute of the Orthodox Church in Serbia. Several of its subsequent versions were rejected by Prince Miloš, who ultimately imposed the version unfavorable to the prestige of the Metropolitanate. It provided that the Prince would preside over the Synod managing the Orthodox Church in Serbia and that he would correspond with the Ecumenical Patriarch of Constantinople on behalf of the Church. In 1834 he developed a new law on marriage, providing that only men aged 17 and over, and women aged 14 and over, with parental consent and their own, would be able to marry. Consent to marriages of men over 50 and women over 40 years of age, as well as to the fourth marriage, was to be approved by a bishop. He also sought to improve the discipline among the Serbian clergy, which had not been high in previous years. This was the result of the earlier subordination of the canonical Serbian lands to the Ecumenical Patriarchate of Constantinople. The bishops of Greek origin operating in Serbia did not care about the education of the lower clergy and they cared mainly for their own enrichment. He wanted to improve the material situation of the clergy, so he created the funds for the benefit of them. He tried to sort out the situation in monasteries, removing alcoholics, assassins, thieves and homosexuals from them. He liquidated the smallest monasteries, and determined the amount of state salary for monks.

=== Later life ===
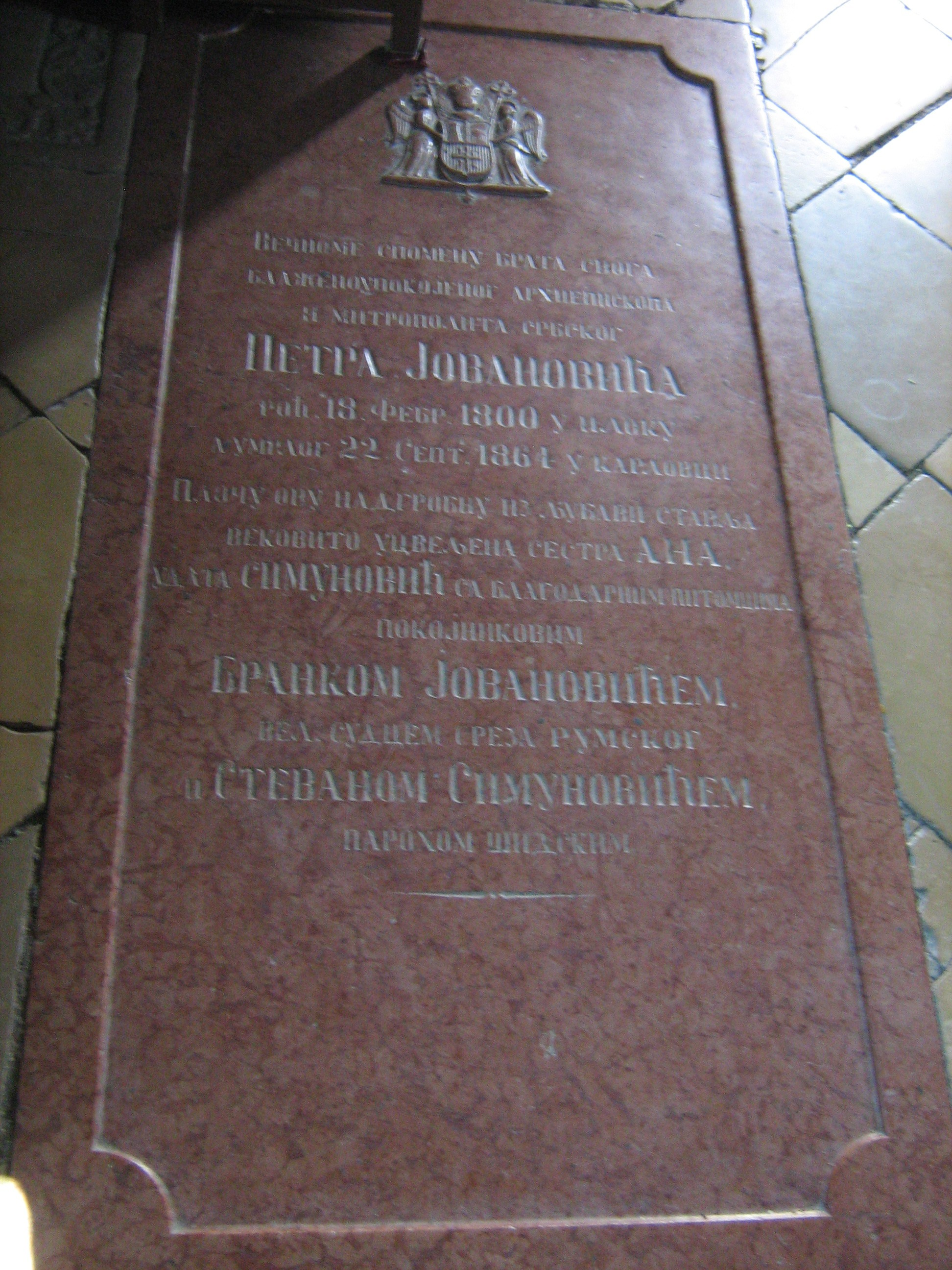
Grave of Metropolitan Petar in the Krušedol Monastery.

In 1859 he left Serbia, de facto leaving the office due to a conflict with Prince Miloš. He returned to the Austrian Empire, where he stayed briefly in Krušedol Monastery, and then he was elected as the Bishop of Gornji Karlovac in the jurisdiction of the Patriarchate of Karlovci. The new Metropolitan of Belgrade became his former student, the Bishop of Šabac Mihailo Jovanović. After the death of Prince Miloš in 1860, the former Metropolitan again applied for the possibility of returning to Serbia, but he did not receive the consent of the new Prince Mihailo Obrenović. He was buried in the Krušedol Monastery.

== Sources ==
- R. Popović, Serbian Orthodox Church in History, Academy of Serbian Orthodox Church for Fine Arts and Conservation, Belgrade 2013.
- Đ. Slijepčević,Istorija Srpske Pravoslavne Crkve, t. II, JRJ, Beograd 2002.

Eastern Orthodox Church titles
Preceded by Melentije Pavlović	Serbian Metropolitan of Belgrade; 1833–1859	Succeeded by Mihailo Jovanović
Preceded by Sergije Kaćanski	Serbian Bishop of Gornji Karlovac; 1859–1864	Succeeded by Lukijan Nikolajević
