= Metropolitanate of Belgrade =

Former autonomous and later independent metropolitanate of the Eastern Orthodox Church

Location
- Territory: Serbia
- Headquarters: Belgrade, Serbia

Information
- Denomination: Eastern Orthodox
- Established: 1831
- Dissolved: 1920
- Language: Church Slavonic; Serbian
- Governance: Self-governing Eastern Orthodox metropolitanate

The Metropolitanate of Belgrade (Serbian: Београдска митрополија, romanized: Beogradska mitropolija) was an Eastern Orthodox autonomous and later independent jurisdiction which existed between 1831 and 1920, with jurisdiction over the territory of Principality and Kingdom of Serbia. It was established in 1831, when the Ecumenical Patriarchate of Constantinople granted autonomy to its eparchies in the Principality of Serbia. Territorial enlargement and full canonical independence were gained in 1879. The metropolitanate existed until 1920, when it was merged with Patriarchate of Karlovci and other Serbian ecclesiastical provinces to form the unified Serbian Orthodox Church.

== List of eparchies ==
Eparchy	Seat	Notes
Eparchy of Belgrade	Belgrade	Now Archdiocese of Belgrade and Karlovci.
Eparchy of Žiča	Čačak	Eparchy of Užice until 1884
Eparchy of Šabac	Šabac	Part of the Eparchy of Belgrade from 1886 to 1891
Eparchy of Timok	Zaječar	Established after 1833, part of the Eparchy of Niš from 1886 to 1891
Eparchy of Niš	Niš	Established in 1879
Eparchy of Raška and Prizren	Prizren	Under jurisdiction from 1912 to 1920
Eparchy of Skopje	Skopje	Under jurisdiction from 1912 to 1920
Eparchy of Debar and Kičevo	Kičevo	Under jurisdiction from 1912 to 1920

== List of metropolitans ==
No.	Primate	Portrait	Personal name	Reign	Title	Notes
1	Melentije; Мелентије; Melenthius		Melentije Pavlović; Мелентије Павловић	1831–1833	Archbishop of Belgrade and Metropolitan of Serbia	First Serb Metropolitan of Belgrade
2	Petar; Петар; Peter		Pavle Jovanović; Павле Јовановић	1833–1859	Archbishop of Belgrade and Metropolitan of Serbia	
3	Mihailo; Михаило; Michael		Miloje Jovanović; Милоје Јовановић	1859–1881	Archbishop of Belgrade and Metropolitan of Serbia	First tenure
	Mojsije; Мојсије; Moses		Maksim Veresić; Максим Вересић	1881–1883	Administrator of the Metropolitanate of Belgrade	Appointed by the Austrophile Serbian government
4	Teodosije; Теодосије; Theodosius		Teodor Mraović; Теодор Мраовић	1883–1889	Archbishop of Belgrade and Metropolitan of Serbia	
(3)	Mihailo; Михаило; Michael		Miloje Jovanović; Милоје Јовановић	1889–1898	Archbishop of Belgrade and Metropolitan of Serbia	Second tenure
5	Inokentije; Инокентије; Innocentius		Jakov Pavlović; Јаков Павловић	1898–1905	Archbishop of Belgrade and Metropolitan of Serbia	
6	Dimitrije; Димитрије; Dimitrius		Dimitrije Pavlović; Димитрије Павловић	1905–1920	Archbishop of Belgrade and Metropolitan of Serbia	Elevated to Patriarch

== See also ==
- Archdiocese of Belgrade and Karlovci
- Serbian Orthodox Church

== Sources ==
- Bataković, Dušan T., ed. (2005). Histoire du peuple serbe [History of the Serbian People] (in French). Lausanne: L’Age d’Homme.
- Ćirković, Sima (2004). The Serbs. Malden: Blackwell Publishing.
- Fotić, Aleksandar (2008). "Serbian Orthodox Church". Encyclopedia of the Ottoman Empire. New York: Infobase Publishing. pp. 519–520.
- Kiminas, Demetrius (2009). The Ecumenical Patriarchate: A History of Its Metropolitanates with Annotated Hierarch Catalogs. Wildside Press LLC.
- Pavlovich, Paul (1989). The History of the Serbian Orthodox Church. Serbian Heritage Books.
- Pavlowitch, Stevan K. (2002). Serbia: The History behind the Name. London: Hurst & Company.
- Popović, Radomir V. (2013). Serbian Orthodox Church in History. Belgrade: Academy of Serbian Orthodox Church for Fine Arts and Conservation.
- Radić, Radmila (2007). "Serbian Christianity". The Blackwell Companion to Eastern Christianity. Malden, MA: Blackwell Publishing. pp. 231–248.
- Radić, Radmila (2015). "The Serbian Orthodox Church in the First World War". The Serbs and the First World War 1914-1918. Belgrade: Serbian Academy of Sciences and Arts. pp. 263–285.
- Radojević, Mira; Mićić, Srđan B. (2015). "Serbian Orthodox Church cooperation and frictions with Ecumenical Patriarchate of Constantinople and Bulgarian Exarchate during interwar period". Studia Academica šumenesia. 2: 126‒143.
