= List of 18th-century religious leaders =

This is a list of the top-level leaders for religious groups with at least 50,000 adherents, and that led anytime from January 1, 1701, to December 31, 1800. It should likewise only name leaders listed on other articles and lists.

== Buddhism ==
=== Pure Land Buddhism ===
- Jodo Shinshu (complete list) –

- Hongwanji-ha

- Jakunyo, Monshu (1662–1725)
- Jūnyo, Monshu (1725–1739)
- Tannyo, Monshu (1739–1741)
- Hōnyo, Monshu (1741–1789)
- Monnyo, Monshu (1789–1799)
- Honnyo, Monshu (1799–1826)

- Ōtani-ha

- Shinnyo, Monshu (1700–1744)
- Jūnyo, Monshu (1744–1760)
- Jōnyo, Monshu (1760–1792)
- Tatsunyo, Monshu (1792–1846)

=== Tibetan Buddhism ===
- Dalai Lama of the Gelug (Yellow Hat sect) –

- Tsangyang Gyatso, 6th Dalai Lama (1688–1706)
- Kelzang Gyatso, 7th Dalai Lama (?–1757)
- Jamphel Gyatso, 8th Dalai Lama (1760–1804)

- Panchen Lama of the Gelug (Yellow Hat sect) –

- Lobsang Yeshe, Panchen Lama (1663–1737)
- Lobsang Palden Yeshe, Panchen Lama (1738–1780)
- Palden Tenpai Nyima, Panchen Lama (1782–1853)

- Tibetan Buddhism, Mongolia –

- Zanabazar Öndur gegeen Luvsadambiyjaltsan, (1635–1723)
- Luvsandambiydonmi, (1724–1757)
- Ishdambiynyam, (1758–1773)
- Luvsantüvdenvanchug, (1775–1813)

== Christianity ==
=== Catholicism ===
- Roman Catholic Church (complete list) -

- Clement XI, Pope (1700–1721)
- Innocent XIII, Pope (1721–1724)
- Benedict XIII, Pope (1724–1730)
- Clement XII, Pope (1730–1740)
- Benedict XIV, Pope (1740–1758)
- Clement XIII, Pope (1758–1769)
- Clement XIV, Pope (1769–1774)
- Pius VI, Pope (1775–1799)
- Pius VII, Pope (1800–1823)

- Old Catholicism: Church of Utrecht -

- Cornelius Steenoven, Archbishop of Utrecht (1723–1725)
- Cornelius Johannes Barchman, Archbishop of Utrecht (1725–1733)
- Theodorus van der Croon, Archbishop of Utrecht (1733–1739)
- Petrus Johannes Meindaerts, Archbishop of Utrecht (1739–1767)
- Gualterus Michael van Nieuwhuyzen, Archbishop of Utrecht (1767–1797)
- Johannes Jacobus van Rhyn, Archbishop of Utrecht (1797–1808)

=== Eastern Orthodoxy ===
- Ecumenical Patriarchate of Constantinople, the first among equals in Eastern Orthodoxy (complete list) –

- Callinicus II, Ecumenical Patriarch (1688, 1689–1693, 1694–1702)
- Gabriel III, Ecumenical Patriarch (1702–1707)
- Neophytus V, Ecumenical Patriarch (1707)
- Cyprianus I, Ecumenical Patriarch (1707–1709)
- Athanasius V, Ecumenical Patriarch (1709–1711)
- Cyril IV, Ecumenical Patriarch (1711–1713)
- Cyprianus I, Ecumenical Patriarch (1713–1714), restored
- Cosmas III, Ecumenical Patriarch (1714–1716)
- Jeremias III, Ecumenical Patriarch (1716–1726)
- Callinicus III, Ecumenical Patriarch (1726), sometimes not counted among the patriarchs
- Paisius II, Ecumenical Patriarch (1726–1732)
- Jeremias III, Ecumenical Patriarch (1732–1733), restored
- Serapheim I, Ecumenical Patriarch (1733–1734)
- Neophytus VI, Ecumenical Patriarch (1734–1740)
- Paisius II, Ecumenical Patriarch (1740–1743), restored 1st time
- Neophytus VI, Ecumenical Patriarch (1743–1744), restored
- Paisius II, Ecumenical Patriarch (1744–1748), restored 2nd time
- Cyril V, Ecumenical Patriarch (1748–1751)
- Paisius II, Ecumenical Patriarch (1751–1752), restored 2nd time
- Cyril V, Ecumenical Patriarch (1752–1757), restored 1st time
- Callinicus IV, Ecumenical Patriarch (1757)
- Serapheim II, Ecumenical Patriarch (1757–1761)
- Joannicius III, Ecumenical Patriarch (1761–1763)
- Samuel I Chatzeres, Ecumenical Patriarch (1763–1768)
- Meletius II, Ecumenical Patriarch (1769–1769)
- Theodosius II, Ecumenical Patriarch (1769–1773)
- Samuel I Chatzeres, Ecumenical Patriarch (1773–1774), restored
- Sophronius II, Ecumenical Patriarch (1774–1780)
- Gabriel IV, Ecumenical Patriarch (1780–1785)
- Procopius I, Ecumenical Patriarch (1785–1789)
- Neophytus VII, Ecumenical Patriarch (1789–1794, 1798–1801)
- Gerasimus III, Ecumenical Patriarch (1794–1797)
- Gregory V, Ecumenical Patriarch (1797–1798, 1806–1808, 1818–1821)

- Greek Orthodox Patriarchate of Alexandria -

- Gerasimos II, Pope and Patriarch (1688–1710)
- Samouil I, Pope and Patriarch (1710–1712)
- Kosmas II, Pope and Patriarch (1712–1714)
- Samouil I, Pope and Patriarch (1714–1723)
- Kosmas II, Pope and Patriarch (1723–1736)
- Kosmas III, Pope and Patriarch (1737–1746)
- Mattheos I, Pope and Patriarch (1746–1766)
- Kyprianos I, Pope and Patriarch (1766–1783)
- Gerasimos III, Pope and Patriarch (1783–1788)
- Parthenios II, Pope and Patriarch (1788–1805)

- Greek Orthodox Patriarchate of Antioch -

- ?, Patriarch (1684–1720)
- Athanasios III (1st time), Patriarch (1686–1694)
- Athanasios III, Patriarch (1720–1724)
- Silvestros I, Patriarch (1724–1766)
- Philimon I, Patriarch (1766–1767)
- Daniil I, Patriarch (1767–1791)
- Anthemios I, Patriarch (1792–1813)

- Greek Orthodox Patriarchate of Jerusalem -

- Dositheos II, Patriarch (1669–1707)
- Chrysanthos I, Patriarch (1707–1731)
- Meletios, Patriarch (1731–1737)
- Parthenios I, Patriarch (1737–1766)
- Ephraim II, Patriarch (1766–1770)
- Sophronios V, Patriarch (1770–1775)
- Avramios I, Patriarch (1775–1787)
- Prokopios I, Patriarch (1787–1788)
- Anthimos I, Patriarch (1788–1808)

- Russian Orthodox Church (complete list) -

- Trifily of Krutitsy, Patriarch of Moscow and All Russia (1700–1701)
- Stefan of Ryazan, Patriarch of Moscow and All Russia (1701–1722)
- ?, Head of Synod (1721–0)
- Iosif, Metropolitan of Moscow (1742–1745)
- Platon I, Metropolitan of Moscow (1745–1754)
- Ilarion of Krutitsy, Metropolitan of Moscow (1754–1757)
- Timofey, Metropolitan of Moscow (1757–1767)
- Amvrosy, Metropolitan of Moscow (1768–1771)
- Samuil of Krutitsy, Metropolitan of Moscow (1771–1775)
- Platon II, Metropolitan of Moscow (1775–1811)
- Nikodim, Metropolitan of St. Petersburg (1742–1745)
- Feodosy, Metropolitan of St. Petersburg (1745–1750)
- Silvestr, Metropolitan of St. Petersburg (1750–1761)
- Veniamin, Metropolitan of St. Petersburg (1761–1762)
- Gavriil I, Metropolitan of St. Petersburg (1762–1770)
- Gavriil II, Metropolitan of St. Petersburg (1770–1799)
- Amvrosy, Metropolitan of St. Petersburg (1799–1818)

- Serbian Orthodox Church -

- Kalinik I, Serbian Patriarch (1691–1710)
- Atanasije I, Serbian Patriarch (1711–1712)
- Mojsije I, Serbian Patriarch (1712–1725)
- Arsenije IV Jovanović-Šakabenta, Serbian Patriarch (1725–1739)
- Joanikije III Karadža, Serbian Patriarch (1739–1746)
- Atanasije II Gavrilović, Serbian Patriarch (1747–1752)
- Gavrilo II, Serbian Patriarch (1752–1752)
- Gavrilo III, Serbian Patriarch (1752–1754)
- Vikentije I, Serbian Patriarch (1754–1756)
- Pajsije II, Serbian Patriarch(1756–1757)
- Gavrilo IV, Serbian Patriarch (1757–1758)
- Kirilo II, Serbian Patriarch (1758–1763)
- Vasilije Jovanović Brkić, Serbian Patriarch (1763–1765)
- Kalinik II, Serbian Patriarch (1765–1766)
- Jeremija Papazoglu, Metropolitan of Belgrade (1766–1784)
- Dionizije I Papazoglu, Metropolitan of Belgrade (1785–1791)
- Metodije, Metropolitan of Belgrade (1791–1801)

- Serbian Orthodox Church in Habsburg monarchy -

- Arsenije III Crnojević, Serbian Patriarch (1674–1706), since 1690 in Habsburg monarchy
- Isaija Đaković, Metropolitan of Krušedol (1708–1708)
- Stefan Metohijac, Metropolitan of Krušedol (1708–1709)
- Sofronije Podgoričanin, Metropolitan of Krušedol (1710–1711)
- Vikentije Popović, Metropolitan of Karlovci (1713–1725)
- Mojsije Petrović, Metropolitan of Karlovci (1726–1730)
- Nikolaj Dimitrijević, Administrator of the Metropolitanate of Karlovci (1730–1731)
- Vikentije Jovanović, Metropolitan of Karlovci (1731–1737)
- Arsenije IV Jovanović Šakabenta, Metropolitan of Karlovci (1737–1748)
- Isaija Antonović, Metropolitan of Karlovci (1748–1749)
- Pavle Nenadović, Metropolitan of Karlovci (1749–1768)
- Jovan Đorđević, Metropolitan of Karlovci (1769–1773)
- Vikentije Jovanović Vidak, Metropolitan of Karlovci (1774–1780)
- Mojsije Putnik, Metropolitan of Karlovci (1781–1790)
- Stefan Stratimirović, Metropolitan of Karlovci (1790–1836)

- Romanian Orthodox Church -

- Theodosios, Metropolitan of Hungaro-Walachia (1679–1708)
- Anthimos, Metropolitan of Hungaro-Walachia (1708–1716)
- Mitrofanis II, Metropolitan of Hungaro-Walachia (1716–1719)
- Daniil II, Metropolitan of Hungaro-Walachia (1719–1731)
- Stephanos II, Metropolitan of Hungaro-Walachia (1732–1738)
- Neophytos I, Metropolitan of Hungaro-Walachia (1738–1753)
- Philaretos I, Metropolitan of Hungaro-Walachia (1753–1760)
- Grigorios II, Metropolitan of Hungaro-Walachia (1760–1787)
- Kosmas, Metropolitan of Hungaro-Walachia (1787–1792)
- Philaretos II, Metropolitan of Hungaro-Walachia (1792–1793)
- Dositheos, Metropolitan of Hungaro-Walachia (1793–1810)

- Georgian Orthodox Church -

- Evdemoz II, Catholicos-Patriarch of Iberia (1700–1703)
- Domenti III, Catholicos-Patriarch of Iberia (1704–1725)
- Besarion, Catholicos-Patriarch of Iberia (1725–1737)
- Kirile, Catholicos-Patriarch of Iberia (1737–1739)
- Domenti III, Catholicos-Patriarch of Iberia (1739–1741)
- Nikoloz VII, Catholicos-Patriarch of Iberia (1742–1744)
- Anton I, Catholicos-Patriarch of Iberia (1744–1755)
- Ioseb, Catholicos-Patriarch of Iberia (1755–1764)
- Anton I, Catholicos-Patriarch of Iberia (1764–1788)
- Anton II, Catholicos-Patriarch of Iberia (1788–1811)

- Orthodox Church of Cyprus -

- Germanos II, Archbishop of Nea Justiniana and All Cypru (1694–1705)
- Athanasios II, Archbishop of Nea Justiniana and All Cypru (1705–1710)
- Iakovos II, Archbishop of Nea Justiniana and All Cypru (1707–1718)
- ?, Archbishop of Nea Justiniana and All Cypru (0–1710)
- Silvestros, Archbishop of Nea Justiniana and All Cypru (1718–1734)
- Philotheos, Archbishop of Nea Justiniana and All Cypru (1734–1745)
- Neophytos III, Archbishop of Nea Justiniana and All Cypru (1745–1745)
- Philotheos, Archbishop of Nea Justiniana and All Cypru (1745–1759)
- Paisios, Archbishop of Nea Justiniana and All Cypru (1759–1761)
- Kyprianos, Archbishop of Nea Justiniana and All Cypru (1761–1762)
- Paisios, Archbishop of Nea Justiniana and All Cypru (1762–1767)
- Chrysanthos, Archbishop of Nea Justiniana and All Cypru (1767–1783)
- Ioannikios, Archbishop of Nea Justiniana and All Cypru (1783–1784)
- Chrysanthos, Archbishop of Nea Justiniana and All Cypru (1784–1810)

- Orthodox Church of Greece -

- Kyrillos II, Metropolitan of Athens (1699–1703)
- Meletios II, Metropolitan of Athens (1703–1713)
- Iakovos II, Metropolitan of Athens (1713–1734)
- Zacharias, Metropolitan of Athens (1734–1741)
- Anthimos VI, Metropolitan of Athens (1741–1756)
- Athanasios III, Metropolitan of Athens (1756–1760)
- Anthimos VI, Metropolitan of Athens (1760–1764)
- Vartholomaios, Metropolitan of Athens (1764–0)
- Neophytos IV, Metropolitan of Athens (0–1774)
- Vartholomaios, Metropolitan of Athens (1774–1781)
- Venediktos, Metropolitan of Athens (1781–1785)
- Athanasios IV, Metropolitan of Athens (1785–1787)
- Venediktos, Metropolitan of Athens (1787–1789)
- Athanasios IV, Metropolitan of Athens (1789–1789)
- Venediktos, Metropolitan of Athens (1789–1796)
- Athanasios IV, Metropolitan of Athens (1796–1799)
- Grigorios III, Metropolitan of Athens (1799–1820)

- Albanian Orthodox Church -

- Kosmas, Metropolitan of Durrë (1694–1702)
- Nikodimos, Metropolitan of Durrë (1702–0)
- Nikitas, Metropolitan of Durrë (1740–1749)
- Anthimos I, Metropolitan of Durrë (1749–1760)
- Neophytos, Metropolitan of Durrë (1760–1761)
- Meletios, Metropolitan of Durrë (1761–1767)
- Grigorios II, Metropolitan of Durrës and Gora (1767–1772)
- Konstantios, Metropolitan of Durrës and Gora (1772–1783)
- Efthymios, Metropolitan of Durrës and Gora (1783–1805)

- Orthodox Church of Mount Sinai -

- Ioannikios I, Archbishop of Sinai (1671–1702)
- Kosmas, Archbishop of Sinai (1702–1706)
- Athanasios, Archbishop of Sinai (1707–1720)
- Ioannikios II, Archbishop of Sinai (1721–1728)
- Nikiphoros, Archbishop of Sinai (1728–1747)
- Konstantios I, Archbishop of Sinai (1748–1759)
- Kyrillos I, Archbishop of Sinai (1759–1790)
- Dorotheos, Archbishop of Sinai (1794–1797)

- Montenegrin Orthodox Church -

- Sava II, Metropolitan (vladika) (1766–1781)
- Arsenije II Plamenac, Metropolitan (vladika) (1781–1782)
- Petar I, Metropolitan (vladika) (1782–1830)
- ?, Metropolitan (vladika) (1784–0)

- Ukrainian Orthodox Church -

- Varlaam I, Metropolitan of Kiev (1690–1707)
- Ioasaf I, Metropolitan of Kiev (1708–1718)
- vacant, Metropolitan of Kiev (1718–1722)
- Varlaam II, Metropolitan of Kiev (1722–1730)
- Raphail, Metropolitan of Kiev (1731–1747)
- Timothei, Metropolitan of Kiev (1748–1757)
- Arseniy I, Metropolitan of Kiev (1757–1770)
- Gavriil I, Metropolitan of Kiev (1770–1783)
- Samuil, Metropolitan of Kiev (1783–1796)
- Ierofei, Metropolitan of Kiev (1796–1799)
- Gavriil II, Metropolitan of Kiev (1799–1803)

- Orthodox Church of Macedonia -

- Raphail, Archbishop of Ohrid (1699–1702)
- Germanos II, Archbishop of Ohrid (1702–1703)
- Ignatios III, Archbishop of Ohrid (1703–1706)
- Dionysios II, Archbishop of Ohrid (1706–1707)
- Zosimas II, Archbishop of Ohrid (1707–1708)
- Methodios I, Archbishop of Ohrid (1708–1709)
- Dionysios II, Archbishop of Ohrid (1709–1714)
- Philotheos, Archbishop of Ohrid (1714–1718)
- Ioasaph II, Archbishop of Ohrid (1718–1745)
- Iosiph, Archbishop of Ohrid (1746–1752)
- Dionysios III, Archbishop of Ohrid (1752–1753)
- Iosiph, Archbishop of Ohrid (1753–1756)
- Dionysios III, Archbishop of Ohrid (1756–1757)
- Methodios II, Archbishop of Ohrid (1757–1759)
- Kyrillos, Archbishop of Ohrid (1759–1763)
- Ieremias, Archbishop of Ohrid (1763–1763)
- Ananias, Archbishop of Ohrid (1763–1764)
- Arsenios II, Archbishop of Ohrid (1764–1767)
- Anthimos II, Metropolitan of Skopje (1767–1775)
- Zacharias, Metropolitan of Skopje (1775–1799)
- Anthimos III, Metropolitan of Skopje (1799–1820)

=== Oriental Orthodoxy ===
- Armenian Apostolic Church -

- Nahapet I, Catholicose of All Armenian (1691–1705)
- Alek'sandr I, Catholicose of All Armenian (1706–1714)
- Astuatsatur I, Catholicose of All Armenian (1715–1725)
- Karapet II, Catholicose of All Armenian (1726–1729)
- Abraham II, Catholicose of All Armenian (1730–1734)
- Abraham III, Catholicose of All Armenian (1734–1737)
- Lazar I, Catholicose of All Armenian (1737–1751)
- Minas I, Catholicose of All Armenian (1751–1753)
- Alek'sandr II, Catholicose of All Armenian (1753–1755)
- Sahak V, Catholicose of All Armenian (1755–0)
- vacant, Catholicose of All Armenian (1755–1759)
- Yakob V, Catholicose of All Armenian (1759–1763)
- Simeon, Catholicose of All Armenian (1763–1780)
- Lukas, Catholicose of All Armenian (1780–1799)
- Hovsep' Arlut'ean, Catholicose of All Armenian (1800–1801)

- Catholicose of Aluank -

- Eremia II, Catholicose of Aluank' (1676–1701)
- Esayi Hasan-Jalalean, Catholicose of Aluank' (1702–1728)
- Nerses V (anti-catholicos), Catholicose of Aluank' (1706–1763)
- Israyel I (anti-catholicos), Catholicose of Aluank' (1763–1765)
- Hovhannes X Hasan-Jalalean, Catholicose of Aluank' (1763–1786)
- Simeon V, Catholicose of Aluank' (1794–1810)

- Armenian Apostolic Church -

- Matevos I, Catholicose of Cilicia (1694–1705)
- Hovhannes V, Catholicose of Cilicia (1705–1721)
- Krikor III, Catholicose of Cilicia (1721–1729)
- Hovhannes VI, Catholicose of Cilicia (1729–1731)
- Ghougas I, Catholicose of Cilicia (1731–1737)
- Mikael I, Catholicose of Cilicia (1737–1758)
- Gabriel I, Catholicose of Cilicia (1758–1770)
- Yeprem I, Catholicose of Cilicia (1771–1784)
- Teotoros I, Catholicose of Cilicia (1784–1796)
- Giragos I, Catholicose of Cilicia (1797–1822)

- Coptic Orthodox Church -

- John XVI, Pope and Patriarch (1676–1718)
- Peter VI, Pope and Patriarch (1718–1726)
- John XVII, Pope and Patriarch (1727–1745)
- Mark VII, Pope and Patriarch (1745–1769)
- John XVIII, Pope and Patriarch (1769–1796)
- Mark VIII, Pope and Patriarch (1797–1810)

- Ethiopian Church -

- Marqos X, Metropolitan of Ethiopia (1694–1716)
- Krestodolos III, Metropolitan of Ethiopia (1718–1745)
- Yohannes XIV, Metropolitan of Ethiopia (1747–1770)
- Yosab III, Metropolitan of Ethiopia (1770–1803)

- Syriac Orthodox Church -

- Ignatius George II, Patriarch of Antioch and All the East (1687–1708)
- Ignatius Isaac Azar, Patriarch of Antioch and All the East (1709–1723)
- Ignatius Shukr Allah II, Patriarch of Antioch and All the East (1723–1745)
- Ignatius George III, Patriarch of Antioch and All the East (1745–1768)
- Ignatius George IV, Patriarch of Antioch and All the East (1768–1780)
- Ignatius Matthew, Patriarch of Antioch and All the East (1782–1817)

- Malabar Independent Syrian Church -

- Kattumangattu Abraham Mar Koorilos I, Metropolitan (1772–1802)

=== Protestantism ===
==== Lutheran ====
- Swedish Church -

- Eric Benzelius, Archbishop of Uppsala (1700–1709)
- Haquin Spegel, Archbishop of Uppsala (1711–1714)
- Matthias Steuchius, Archbishop of Uppsala (1714–1730)
- Johannes Steuchius, Archbishop of Uppsala (1730–1742)
- Eric Benzelius d.y., Archbishop of Uppsala (1742–1743)
- Jacob Benzelius, Archbishop of Uppsala (1744–1747)
- Henric Benzelius, Archbishop of Uppsala (1747–1758)
- Samuel Troilius, Archbishop of Uppsala (1758–1764)
- Magnus Beronius, Archbishop of Uppsala (1764–1775)
- Carl Fredrik Mennander, Archbishop of Uppsala (1775–1786)
- Uno von Troil, Archbishop of Uppsala (1786–1803)

- Finnish Church -

- Johannes Gezelius the younger, Bishop of Turku (1690–1718)
- Herman Witte, Bishop of Turku (1721–1728)
- Lars Tammelin, Bishop of Turku (1728–1733)
- Jonas Fahlenius, Bishop of Turku (1734–1748)
- Johan Browallius, Bishop of Turku (1748–1755)
- Karl Fredrik Mennander, Bishop of Turku (1757–1775)
- Jakob Haartman, Bishop of Turku (1776–1788)
- Jakob Gadolin, Bishop of Turku (1788–1802)

==== Anglicanism ====
- Church of England

- Formal leadership: Supreme Governor of the Church of England (complete list) –

- William III, co-Supreme Governor (1689–1694), Supreme Governor (1694–1702)
- Anne, Supreme Governor (1702–1714)
- George I, Supreme Governor (1714–1727)
- George II, Supreme Governor (1727–1760)
- George III, Supreme Governor (1760–1820)

- Effective leadership: Archbishops of Canterbury (complete list) –

- Thomas Tenison, Archbishop (1695–1715)
- William Wake, Archbishop (1716–1737)
- John Potter, Archbishop (1737–1747)
- Thomas Herring, Archbishop (1747–1757)
- Matthew Hutton, Archbishop (1757–1758)
- Thomas Secker, Archbishop (1758–1768)
- Frederick Cornwallis, Archbishop (1768–1783)
- John Moore, Archbishop (1783–1805)

- Episcopal Church (United States) (complete list) –

- William White, Presiding Bishop (1789)
- Samuel Seabury, Presiding Bishop (1789–1792)
- Samuel Provoost, Presiding Bishop (1792–1795)
- William White, Presiding Bishop (1795–1836)

=== Other Christian or Christian-derived faiths ===
- Assyrian Church of the East, line 1 -

- Eliyya XI Marogin, Patriarch (1700–1722)
- Eliyya XII Dinkha, Patriarch (1722–1778)
- Eliyya XIII Isho-Yab, Patriarch (1778–1804)

- Assyrian Church of the East, line 2 -

- Shimoun XIV Sleman, Patriarch (1700–1740)
- Shimoun XV Maqdassi, Patriarch (1740–1780)
- Shimoun XVI Yohanan, Patriarch (1780–1820)

- Assyrian Church of the East -

== Islam ==
=== Sunni ===
- Ottoman Empire, (complete list) -

- Mustafa II, Caliph (1695–1703)
- Ahmed III, Caliph (1703–1730)
- Mahmud I, Caliph (1730–1754)
- Osman III, Caliph (1754–1757)
- Mustafa III, Caliph (1757–1774)
- Abdul Hamid I, Caliph (1774–1789)
- Selim III, Caliph (1789–1807)

=== Shia ===
- Twelver Islam

- Imams (complete list) –

- Muhammad al-Mahdi, Imam (874–present) Shia belief holds that he was hidden by Allah in 874.

- Nizari Isma'ilism (complete list) –

- Shah Nizar II, Imam (1680–1722)
- As-Sayyid Ali, Imam (1722–1754)
- Hasan Ali, Imam (1754– mid 18th century)
- Qasim Ali (Sayyid Ja'far), Imam (mid–late 18th century)
- Abu-l-Hasan Ali, Imam (late 18th century – 1792)
- Shāh Khalīlullāh III, Imam (1792–1817)

- Zaidiyyah (complete list) –

- al-Mahdi Muhammad, Imam (1687–1718)
- al-Mansur al-Husayn, Imam (1716–1720)
- al-Mutawakkil al-Qasim, Imam (1716–1727)
- an-Nasir Muhammad, Imam (1723)
- al-Mansur al-Husayn II, Imam (1727–1748)
- al-Mahdi Abbas, Imam (1748–1775)
- al-Mansur Ali I, Imam (1775–1809)

- Mumini (complete list) –

- Mu'in al-Din II bin 'Aziz Shah, Imam (1691–1715)
- Amir Muhammad bin Mu'in al-Din II al-Musharraf, Imam (1715–1764)
- Haydar bin Muhammad al-Mutahhar, Imam (1764–1786)
- Amir Muhammad bin Haydar al-Baqir, Imam (1786–1796); last imam of the Mu'mini line

- Dawoodi Bohra (complete list) –

- Musa Kalimuddin, Da'i al-Mutlaq (1692–1711)
- Noor Mohammad Nooruddin, Da'i al-Mutlaq (1711–1719)
- Ismail Badruddin II, Da'i al-Mutlaq (1719–1738)
- Ibrahim Wajiuddin, Da'i al-Mutlaq (1738–1756)
- Hebatullah-il-Moayed Fiddeen, Da'i al-Mutlaq (1756–1780)
- Abduttayyeb Zakiuddin Bin Badruddin, Da'i al-Mutlaq (1780–1787)
- Yusuf Najmuddin, Da'i al-Mutlaq (1787–1799)
- Abde Ali Saifuddin, Da'i al-Mutlaq (1799–1817)

== Judaism and related ==
- British Empire (complete list) -

- Aaron Hart, Rabbi of the Great Synagogue (1704–1756)
- Hart Lyon, Rabbi of the Great Synagogue 1758–1764)
- David Tevele Schiff, Rabbi appointed by the Great Synagogue (1765–1766)
- Meshullam Solomon, (1765–1780), Appointed in opposition
- David Tevele Schiff, Chief Rabbi (1780–1791)

- Ottoman Empire –

- Hayim Kamhi, Chief Rabbi (1677–1715)
- Yehuda Ben Rey, Chief Rabbi (1715–1717)
- Samuel Levi, Chief Rabbi (1717–1720)
- Abraham Rozanes, Chief Rabbi (1720–1745)
- Salomon Hayim Alfandari, Chief Rabbi (1745–1762)
- Mayir Ishaki, Chief Rabbi (1762–1780)
- Eliyaho Palombo, Chief Rabbi (1780–1800)
- Hayim Yakup Benyakar, Chief Rabbi (1800–1835)

- Chabad Hasidism -

- Shneur Zalman, Leaders, called Lubavitcher Rebbe (1780–1812)

== Other ==
=== Jainism ===
- Svetambara Jainism -

- Bhiksu, Leader (Acarya) (1760–1803)
