= Gavrilo III, Serbian Patriarch =

Serbian Patriarch

Gavrilo III
- Archbishop of Peć and Serbian Patriarch
- Church: Serbian Patriarchate of Peć
- See: Patriarchate of Peć Monastery
- Installed: 1752
- Term ended: 1758
- Predecessor: Gavrilo II
- Successor: Vikentije I

Personal details
- Denomination: Eastern Orthodoxy

Gavrilo III Nikolić (Serbian Cyrillic: Гаврило III Николић) was the Patriarch of the Serbian Patriarchate of Peć from 1752 to 1758.

Before becoming the Serbian Patriarch, he was Metropolitan of Niš, under Serbian patriarch Atanasije II. When Atanasije died in 1752, Serbian patriarchal throne was taken by Metropolitan of Dabar and Bosnia Gavrilo II who also died soon after returning from Constantinople in the autumn of the same year, struck by sudden illness. Before death, he made succession arrangements with metropolitan Gavrilo Nikolić, who was elected new Serbian Patriarch as Gavrilo III. In following years, Serbian Patriarchate of Peć was in constant internal turmoil, accompanied by worsening financial crisis and huge debts. Between 1755 and 1758, Gavrilo III was challenged by rivals and finally lost the patriarchal throne, but in 1761, a group of Serbian bishops and other ecclesiastical leaders who met in Niš tried to bring him back, without final success.

== See also ==
- List of heads of the Serbian Orthodox Church

Eastern Orthodox Church titles
Preceded by -	Metropolitan of Niš before 1752	Succeeded by Kalinik
Preceded by Gavrilo II	Serbian Patriarch; 1752–1758	Succeeded by Vikentije I

== Sources ==
- Ćirković, Sima (2004). The Serbs. Malden: Blackwell Publishing. ISBN 9781405142915.
- Fotić, Aleksandar (2008). "Serbian Orthodox Church". Encyclopedia of the Ottoman Empire. New York: Infobase Publishing. pp. 519–520. ISBN 9781438110257.
- Kašić, Dušan, ed. (1965). Serbian Orthodox Church: Its past and present. Vol. 1. Belgrade: Serbian Orthodox Church.
- Pavlovich, Paul (1989). The History of the Serbian Orthodox Church. Serbian Heritage Books. ISBN 9780969133124.
- Слијепчевић, Ђоко М. (1962). Историја Српске православне цркве (History of the Serbian Orthodox Church). Vol. књ. 1. Минхен: Искра.
- Вуковић, Сава (1996). Српски јерарси од деветог до двадесетог века (Serbian Hierarchs from the 9th to the 20th Century). Београд: Евро.
