= Nikodim II =

Serbian Patriarch

- Archbishop of Peć and Serbian Patriarch
- Church: Serbian Patriarchate of Peć
- See: Patriarchate of Peć Monastery
- Installed: 1445
- Term ended: 1455
- Predecessor: Teofan I
- Successor: Arsenije II

Personal details
- Denomination: Eastern Orthodoxy

Nikodim II (Serbian Cyrillic: Никодим II) was the Patriarch of the Serbian Patriarchate of Peć in the period of 1445–1455.

As the hegumen of the Studenica monastery, Nikodim was appointed the Metropolitan of Raška sometime prior to 1439. Serbian ruler, despot Đurađ Branković strongly opposed Uniatism and did not send his delegates to the Council of Florence in 1439, when the short-lived "Union" between the Byzantine Emperor and the Pope was concluded. That year, much of the Serbian Despotate, including the capital city of Smederevo fell for the first time to the Ottomans, but after a couple of years of occupation restored freedom and independence in 1444. Soon after that, metropolitan Nicodim was chosen for the Serbian Patriarch in 1445. He chirotonized the Moldavian metropolitan Teoktist, instead of the old Joakim who supported Uniatism. In 1452, Nikodim II gifted the manuscript book Margarit of John Chrysostom, which is today held in the Monastery of the Holy Trinity of Pljevlja. Nikodim II was the penultimate Serbian Patriarch before the fall of the Serbian Despotate under the Ottomans, who conquered Christian Constantinople in 1453.

== See also ==
- List of heads of the Serbian Orthodox Church

Eastern Orthodox Church titles
| Preceded by Teofan I | Serbian Patriarch; 1445–1455 | Succeeded by Arsenije II |

== Sources ==
- Слијепчевић, Ђоко М. (1962). Историја Српске православне цркве (History of the Serbian Orthodox Church). Vol. књ. 1. Минхен: Искра.
- Вуковић, Сава (1996). Српски јерарси од деветог до двадесетог века (Serbian Hierarchs from the 9th to the 20th Century). Београд: Евро.
- Ćirković, Sima (2004). The Serbs. Malden: Blackwell Publishing. ISBN 9781405142915.
