= Gavrilo IV, Serbian Patriarch =

18th-century Greek Orthodox archbishop

Gavrilo IV
- Archbishop of Peć and Serbian Patriarch
- Church: Serbian Patriarchate of Peć
- See: Patriarchate of Peć Monastery
- Installed: 1758
- Term ended: 1758
- Predecessor: Pajsije II
- Successor: Kirilo II

Personal details
- Denomination: Eastern Orthodoxy

Gavrilo IV (Serbian Cyrillic: Гаврило IV, Greek: Γαβριήλ Δ') was the Patriarch of the Serbian Patriarchate of Peć for a short time during the turbulent year of 1758. He was an ethnic Greek.

Before Gavrilo became Serbian Patriarch, he was the metropolitan of an unknown eparchy, under Serbian patriarchs Vikentije I and Pajsije II. In 1758, during the great internal turmoil in the Serbian Patriarchate of Peć, when patriarch Vikentije I died in Constantinople and his successor Pajsije II seized the patriarchal throne, metropolitan Gavrilo took the opportunity and succeeded in overthrowing patriarch Pajsije II and becoming the new Serbian Patriarch as "Gavrilo IV". His tenure was also very short since his main rival was another ethnic Greek, metropolitan Kirilo, who succeeded in overthrowing Gavrilo IV and becoming the new Serbian Patriarch as Kirilo II.

== See also ==
- List of heads of the Serbian Orthodox Church

Eastern Orthodox Church titles
Preceded by Pajsije II	Serbian Patriarch; 1758	Succeeded by Kirilo II

== Sources ==
- Ćirković, Sima (2004). The Serbs. Malden: Blackwell Publishing. ISBN 9781405142915.
- Fotić, Aleksandar (2008). "Serbian Orthodox Church". Encyclopedia of the Ottoman Empire. New York: Infobase Publishing. pp. 519–520. ISBN 9781438110257.
- Kašić, Dušan, ed. (1965). Serbian Orthodox Church: Its past and present. Vol. 1. Belgrade: Serbian Orthodox Church.
- Pavlovich, Paul (1989). The History of the Serbian Orthodox Church. Serbian Heritage Books. ISBN 9780969133124.
- Слијепчевић, Ђоко М. (1962). Историја Српске православне цркве (History of the Serbian Orthodox Church). Vol. књ. 1. Минхен: Искра.
- Вуковић, Сава (1996). Српски јерарси од деветог до двадесетог века (Serbian Hierarchs from the 9th to the 20th Century). Београд: Евро.
