= Gavrilo II, Serbian Patriarch =

Serbian Patriarch

Gavrilo II
- Archbishop of Peć and Serbian Patriarch
- Church: Serbian Patriarchate of Peć
- See: Patriarchate of Peć Monastery
- Installed: 1752
- Term ended: 1752
- Predecessor: Atanasije II
- Successor: Gavrilo III

Personal details
- Born: beginning of 18th century Sarajevo, Bosnia Eyalet
- Died: 1752 Peć
- Denomination: Eastern Orthodoxy

Gavrilo II (Serbian Cyrillic: Гаврило II; fl. 1741 – 1752) was the Patriarch of the Serbian Patriarchate of Peć for a short time during the second half of 1752, having earlier served as the Metropolitan of Dabar and Bosnia since 1741.

Gavrilo, surnamed Mihailović (Михаиловић), was born at the beginning of 18th century into a Serb family in Sarajevo, at the time part of the Bosnia Eyalet. He took monastic vows and became one of the main aides of Metropolitan of Dabar and Bosnia Melentije Milenković. When Melentije died, Gavrilo succeeded him as metropolitan in 1741, serving under Serbian Patriarch Joanikije III (s. 1739–46). As a metropolitan, he made canonical visits to many places on the territory of his eparchy.

In 1752, because of high church taxes and other issues, he came into conflict with leaders of his flock in Sarajevo, who initiated the procedure for his removal, asking help from Serbian Patriarch Atanasije II (1747–1752). When Atanasije II soon died, Gavrilo took the opportunity to bid for the patriarchal throne and traveled to Constantinople in order to gain confirmation from the sultan. His success was short-lived. On 6 October he was confirmed as Patriarch, but soon upon return, he was struck with sudden illness and had to make succession arrangements with Metropolitan of Niš Gavrilo Nikolić. Ten days later, Patriarch Gavrilo II died and metropolitan Gavrilo Nikolić was elected new Serbian Patriarch as Gavrilo III.

He was styled "Archbishop of Dabar, Travunia, Zvornik, Mačva, Klis, and all of Bosnia".

== See also ==
- List of heads of the Serbian Orthodox Church

Eastern Orthodox Church titles
| Preceded by Melentije Milenković | Metropolitan of Dabar-Bosnia; 1741–1752 | Succeeded by Pajsije Lazarević |
| Preceded by Atanasije II | Serbian Patriarch; 1752 | Succeeded by Gavrilo III |

== Sources ==
- Ćirković, Sima (2004). The Serbs. Malden: Blackwell Publishing. ISBN 9781405142915.
- Fotić, Aleksandar (2008). "Serbian Orthodox Church". Encyclopedia of the Ottoman Empire. New York: Infobase Publishing. pp. 519–520. ISBN 9781438110257.
- Kašić, Dušan, ed. (1965). Serbian Orthodox Church: Its past and present. Vol. 1. Belgrade: Serbian Orthodox Church.
- Pavlovich, Paul (1989). The History of the Serbian Orthodox Church. Serbian Heritage Books. ISBN 9780969133124.
- Слијепчевић, Ђоко М. (1962). Историја Српске православне цркве (History of the Serbian Orthodox Church). Vol. књ. 1. Минхен: Искра.
- Вуковић, Сава (1996). Српски јерарси од деветог до двадесетог века (Serbian Hierarchs from the 9th to the 20th Century). Београд: Евро.
