= Kirilo II, Serbian Patriarch =

Serbian Patriarch

Kirilo II
- Archbishop of Peć and Serbian Patriarch
- Church: Serbian Patriarchate of Peć
- See: Patriarchate of Peć Monastery
- Installed: 1759
- Term ended: 1763
- Predecessor: Gavrilo IV
- Successor: Vasilije I

Personal details
- Denomination: Eastern Orthodoxy

Kirilo II (Serbian Cyrillic: Кирило II, Greek: Κύριλλος Β΄) was the Patriarch of the Serbian Patriarchate of Peć from 1759 to 1763. He was of ethnic Greek origin.

In 1758, internal crisis and struggles in the Serbian Patriarchate of Peć resulted in deposition of Patriarch Gavrilo IV, and soon after that another ethnic Greek — metropolitan Cyril (Greek: Κύριλλος), was appointed at his place, becoming Serbian Patriarch Kirilo II. New patriarch had to face many difficulties, since the Serbian Patriarchate of Peć was in great debt, and he also faced some internal opposition among ethnic Serbian clergy. One of Serbian metropolitans, Vasilije Jovanović-Brkić of Dabar and Bosnia managed to depose and succeed patriarch Kirilo II in 1763, becoming new Serbian patriarch as Vasilije I.

== See also ==
- List of heads of the Serbian Orthodox Church

Eastern Orthodox Church titles
Preceded by Gavrilo IV	Serbian Patriarch; 1759–1763	Succeeded by Vasilije I

== Sources ==
- Ćirković, Sima (2004). The Serbs. Malden: Blackwell Publishing. ISBN 9781405142915.
- Fotić, Aleksandar (2008). "Serbian Orthodox Church". Encyclopedia of the Ottoman Empire. New York: Infobase Publishing. pp. 519–520. ISBN 9781438110257.
- Kašić, Dušan, ed. (1965). Serbian Orthodox Church: Its past and present. Vol. 1. Belgrade: Serbian Orthodox Church.
- Pavlovich, Paul (1989). The History of the Serbian Orthodox Church. Serbian Heritage Books. ISBN 9780969133124.
- Слијепчевић, Ђоко М. (1962). Историја Српске православне цркве (History of the Serbian Orthodox Church). Vol. књ. 1. Минхен: Искра.
- Вуковић, Сава (1996). Српски јерарси од деветог до двадесетог века (Serbian Hierarchs from the 9th to the 20th Century). Београд: Евро.
