= Archbishop Sava =

Archbishop Sava may refer to:

- Archbishop Sava I, Serbian Archbishop from 1219 to 1233
- Archbishop Sava II, Serbian Archbishop from 1263 to 1271
- Archbishop Sava III, Serbian Archbishop from 1309 to 1316
- Archbishop Sava IV, Archbishop of Peć and Serbian Patriarch from 1354 to 1375
- Archbishop Sava V, Archbishop of Peć and Serbian Patriarch from 1396 to 1406

== See also ==
- Patriarch Sava (disambiguation)
- Archbishop Arsenije (disambiguation)
- List of heads of the Serbian Orthodox Church
