= Atanasije II Gavrilović =

Serbian Patriarch

Atanasije II
- Archbishop of Peć and Serbian Patriarch
- Church: Serbian Patriarchate of Peć
- See: Patriarchate of Peć Monastery
- Installed: 1747
- Term ended: 1752
- Predecessor: Joanikije III
- Successor: Gavrilo II

Personal details
- Born: late 17th century Skopje
- Died: 1752 Peć
- Denomination: Eastern Orthodoxy

Atanasije II Gavrilović (Serbian Cyrillic: Атанасије II Гавриловић; Skopje, late 17th century – Peć, 1752) was the Patriarch of the Serbian Patriarchate of Peć from 1747 to 1752.

He was first mentioned in 1741 as the Metropolitan of Skopje. At that time, the throne of Serbian Patriarchate of Peć was contested between the Serbs, who were seen as rebels by the Ottomans, and Phanariote Greeks, who were very much loyal to the authorities. In the last Austro-Turkish War (1737–1739), in which Serbs supported Vienna, a major migration northwards into Habsburg territory was led by Serbian Patriarch Arsenije IV. The Ottomans brought Joanikije III, a Greek, to the throne in Peć. During his days all connections with Serbs in the Habsburg Empire were cut. Thus, the election – an Ottoman approval – of a Serb as the head of the Serbian Patriarchate of Peć delighted all the Serbs.

Immediately after his election Atanasije II made a canonical visit to Sarajevo. In 1748 we find him in Niš. In 1749 he visited Rila monastery, at the time a part of his patriarchate.

That same year Atanasije II visited Montenegro and then continued to the Adriatic littoral to visit his flock. He was accompanied by metropolitan of Cetinje Sava Petrović. The worried Venetian authorities tried to prevent their movement by increasing the sanitary measures for all people coming from the Ottoman Empire, thus also to the patriarch and his entourage. Next year (1750) Atanasije was in Belgrade where he installed Vasilije Petrović as the new metropolitan of Cetinje.

Atanasije II worked hard to reestablish the broken connections with Serbs in the Habsburg Empire whose church was now organized under the Metropolitan of Karlovci. As one of tokens of this renewed collaboration copper plates from book printing were sent from Sremski Karlovci to Atanasije II.

Since the treasury of the Serbian Patriarchate of Peć was all but emptied during the irresponsible rule of his predecessor, in 1750 Atanasije II sent his exarch, abbot of Studenica Vasilije Petrović to collect donations in the regions of the Metropolitan of Karlovci. Same was done in 1751 in the diocese of Valjevo. Atanasije II died in 1752.

== See also ==
- List of heads of the Serbian Orthodox Church

Eastern Orthodox Church titles
Preceded by Joanikije III	Serbian Patriarch; 1747–1752	Succeeded by Gavrilo II

== Sources ==
- Ćirković, Sima (2004). The Serbs. Malden: Blackwell Publishing. ISBN 9781405142915.
- Fotić, Aleksandar (2008). "Serbian Orthodox Church". Encyclopedia of the Ottoman Empire. New York: Infobase Publishing. pp. 519–520. ISBN 9781438110257.
- Kašić, Dušan, ed. (1965). Serbian Orthodox Church: Its past and present. Vol. 1. Belgrade: Serbian Orthodox Church.
- Pavlovich, Paul (1989). The History of the Serbian Orthodox Church. Serbian Heritage Books. ISBN 9780969133124.
- Слијепчевић, Ђоко М. (1962). Историја Српске православне цркве (History of the Serbian Orthodox Church). Vol. књ. 1. Минхен: Искра.
- Вуковић, Сава (1996). Српски јерарси од деветог до двадесетог века (Serbian Hierarchs from the 9th to the 20th Century). Београд: Евро.
- Сава Вуковић, "Атанасије ІІ Гавриловић", Српски биографски речник, књ. 1, Нови Сад 2004, 294.
