= Kalinik =

Kalinik (Serbian: Калиник) is a Serbian masculine given name, a variant of the Greek name Kallinikos (Callinicus).

Notable people with the name include:

- Kalinik I (d. 1710), head of the Serbian Orthodox Church from 1691 until 1710.
- Kalinik II, head of the Serbian Orthodox Church from 1765 to 1766
- Kalinik of Sarajevo, metropolitan of Dabar-Bosnia (1808–16)

== See also ==
- Patriarch Kalinik (disambiguation)
