= Pajsije II =

Serbian Patriarch

- Archbishop of Peć and Serbian Patriarch
- Church: Serbian Patriarchate of Peć
- See: Patriarchate of Peć Monastery
- Installed: 1758
- Term ended: 1758
- Predecessor: Vikentije I
- Successor: Gavrilo IV

Personal details
- Denomination: Eastern Orthodoxy

Pajsije II (Serbian Cyrillic: Пајсије II, Greek: Παΐσιος Β΄) was the Patriarch of the Serbian Patriarchate of Peć for a short time during 1758. He was of ethnic Greek origin.

Before he became Serbian Patriarch, he was Metropolitan of Užice and Valjevo, under Vikentije I. In 1758, when Patriarch Vikentije went to Constantinople, metropolitan Pajsije traveled with him. While staying in Constantinople, Serbian Patriarch was struck with sudden illness and died. Metropolitan Pajsije took the opportunity and succeeded in becoming new Serbian Patriarch Pajsije II. His tenure was very short since in that time Serbian Patriarchate of Peć was in constant internal turmoil. His main rival was another ethnic Greek, metropolitan Gavrilo, who succeeded in overthrowing Pajsije II and becoming new Serbian Patriarch as Gavrilo IV.

== See also ==
- List of heads of the Serbian Orthodox Church

Eastern Orthodox Church titles
Preceded by Vikentije I	Serbian Patriarch; 1758	Succeeded by Gavrilo IV

== Sources ==
- Ćirković, Sima (2004). The Serbs. Malden: Blackwell Publishing. ISBN 9781405142915.
- Fotić, Aleksandar (2008). "Serbian Orthodox Church". Encyclopedia of the Ottoman Empire. New York: Infobase Publishing. pp. 519–520. ISBN 9781438110257.
- Kašić, Dušan, ed. (1965). Serbian Orthodox Church: Its past and present. Vol. 1. Belgrade: Serbian Orthodox Church.
- Pavlovich, Paul (1989). The History of the Serbian Orthodox Church. Serbian Heritage Books. ISBN 9780969133124.
- Слијепчевић, Ђоко М. (1962). Историја Српске православне цркве (History of the Serbian Orthodox Church). Vol. књ. 1. Минхен: Искра.
- Вуковић, Сава (1996). Српски јерарси од деветог до двадесетог века (Serbian Hierarchs from the 9th to the 20th Century). Београд: Евро.
