= Patriarch Sava =

Patriarch Sava may refer to:

- Patriarch Sava IV, Serbian Patriarch from 1354 to 1375
- Patriarch Sava V, Serbian Patriarch from 1396 to 1406

== See also ==
- List of heads of the Serbian Orthodox Church
- Archbishop Sava (disambiguation)
