= Vasilije, Serbian Patriarch =

Serbian Patriarch

Vasilije
- Archbishop of Peć and Serbian Patriarch
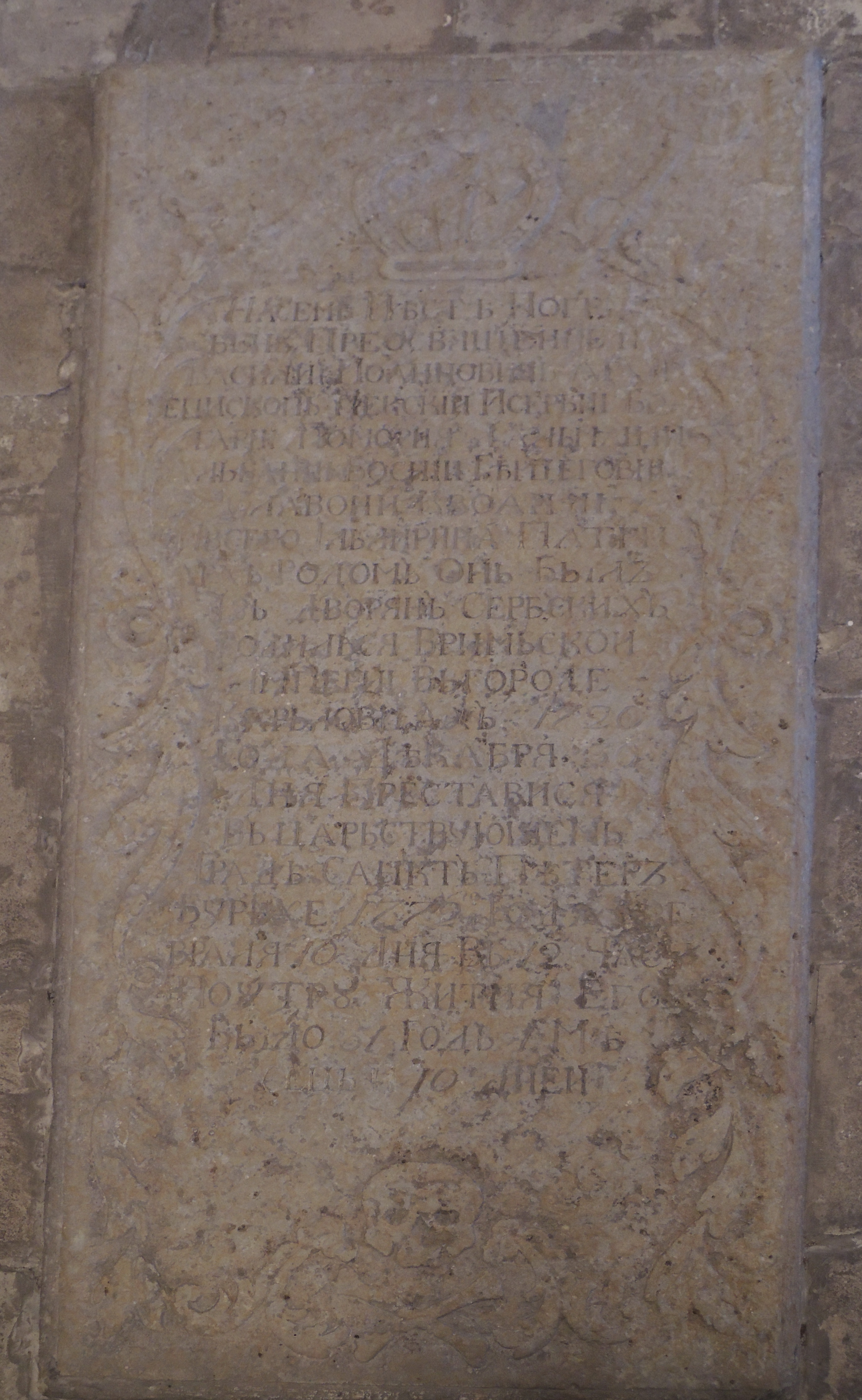
- Tomb of Vasilije I in the Nevsky Lavra
- Church: Serbian Patriarchate of Peć
- See: Patriarchate of Peć Monastery
- Installed: 1763
- Term ended: 1765
- Predecessor: Kirilo II
- Successor: Kalinik II

Personal details
- Born: 1719 Sremski Karlovci, Austrian Empire
- Died: 1772 (aged 52–53) Imperial Russia
- Denomination: Eastern Orthodoxy

Vasilije (Serbian Cyrillic: Василије; 1719–1772) was the Patriarch of the Serbian Patriarchate of Peć from 1763 to 1765. Vasilije was the last ethnic Serb patriarch before the abolition of the Serbian Patriarchate of Peć in 1766.

== Life ==
Vasilije, surnamed Jovanović Brkić, was born in 1719 in Sremski Karlovci. His father Jovan was a teacher. From 1732 to 1738, Vasilije attended a Slavic college at Karlovci (Collegium slavono-latino carloviciense) headed by Emanuel Kozačinski, at the same time as Vasilije Nenadović, the nephew of Metropolitan Pavle Nenadović. Later, the Austrian authorities closed the school and prohibited Serbian youth to pursue higher education in their own language. In the meantime, Vasilije was elevated to protodeacon by metropolitan Arsenije IV Jovanović Šakabenta and with that post, he was the supervisor of all deacons in the Metropolitanate of Karlovci. He supported and funded Hristofor Žefarović's monumental work. In 1749 Vasilije became a suspect when he took too many liberties with the church treasury and the Bačka bishop Visarion Pavlović, the abbot of Remeta Atanasije Isaijević, and the Kotor providur Ivan Zusta accused him of absconding. Finding himself in a predicament he chose to leave Austria for Ottoman Serbia.

The Serbian Patriarch Kirilo II, who was an ethnic Greek, appointed Vasilije the bishop of Novo Brdo, and then transferred him to the metropolitan in Sarajevo (Dabar-Bosna). Vasilije managed to remove Kirilo from the patriarchal chair with the help of Serb bishops, and was appointed patriarch in 1763. The Ottoman authorities removed him from the post after slander from the deposed Kirilo and his relatives. Accused of espionage, he was detained on the island of Cyprus. With the help of French diplomacy, Vasilije was released from prison and managed to escape from Cyprus to southern Dalmatia, and then to Janjevo, from where he went to Montenegro in 1767. There he met Russian prince Yuri Vladimirovich Dolgorukov who was to interrogate the false emperor Šćepan Mali. Together they went to Trieste and then to Livorno, thanks to transport arrangements made by Russian admiral count Alexei Grigoryevich Orlov (1737–1808). At the request of Orlov, he wrote a "Description of Turkish areas and Christian peoples in them, especially the Serb people".

The Patriarch Kalinik II (t. 1765–1766), also an ethnic Greek, together with other Greek bishops asked the Porte to have the patriarchate abolished due to debts. Ecumenical Patriarch Samuel Hanceris (t. 1763–1769) discussed with Sultan Mustafa III (r. 1757–1774) who accepted the requests and abolished the Serbian Patriarchate due to "over-indebtedness" with the berat of 11 September 1766.

Vasilije wrote a report in 1771 for the needs of the Russian government on Christian-inhabited areas in the Ottoman Empire, with focus on Serbs.

== Works ==
- "Description of Turkish areas and Christian peoples in them, especially the Serb people"
- Sluzbu i Sineksar Sv. Vasilija Ostrogskom

== See also ==
- List of heads of the Serbian Orthodox Church

Eastern Orthodox Church titles
Preceded by Kirilo II	Serbian Patriarch; 1763–1765	Succeeded by Kalinik II
Preceded by Pajsije Lazarević	Metropolitan of Dabar and Bosna; 21 May 1759–1763	Succeeded by Dionisije

== Sources ==
- Vuković, Sava (1996). Српски јерарси од деветог до двадесетог века (Serbian Hierarchs from the 9th to the 20th Century). Београд: Евро. p. 61.
