= Patriarch Pajsije =

Patriarch Pajsije may refer to:

- Pajsije of Janjevo, Archbishop of Peć and Serbian Patriarch from 1614 to 1647
- Pajsije II, Archbishop of Peć and Serbian Patriarch for a short time during 1758
