= Danilo IV =

Serbian Patriarch

Danilo IV (Serbian Cyrillic: Данило IV) was the Patriarch of the Serbian Patriarchate of Peć in the period of 1406–1407. After Patriarch Sava V's death, Danilo was chosen as the successor. Very little is known of him, his appointment coming in a time of conflict between the Lazarević and Branković families. After a year, he was succeeded by Kirilo I.

== See also ==
- List of heads of the Serbian Orthodox Church

Preceded by Sava V	Serbian Patriarch; 1406–1407	Succeeded by Kirilo I

== Sources ==
- Purković, Miodrag (1976). Srpski patrijarsi Srednjega veka. Srpska pravoslavna eparhija zapadnoevropska.
- Sava of Šumadija (1996). Srpski jerarsi: od devetog do dvadesetog veka. Evro.
