= Kalinik II =

Serbian Patriarch

- Archbishop of Peć and Serbian Patriarch
- Church: Serbian Patriarchate of Peć
- See: Patriarchate of Peć Monastery
- Installed: 1765
- Term ended: 1766
- Predecessor: Vasilije I
- Successor: Dimitrije I

Personal details
- Denomination: Eastern Orthodoxy

Kalinik II (Serbian: Калиник II, Greek: Καλλίνικος Β΄, Latin: Callinicus II) was the Patriarch of the Serbian Patriarchate of Peć from 1765 to 1766. He was the last holder of that office before the Ottoman Empire abolished the Serbian Patriarchate of Peć in 1766. As an ethnic Greek, he was seen as a foreigner among Serbs, who favored the deposed patriarch Vasilije I. Since his tenure was marked by various internal conflicts, Kalinik decided to resign his post, and even went a step further: he sent a pre-agreed petition to the Ecumenical Patriarch of Constantinople asking for the abolition of the Serbian Patriarchate of Peć, citing accumulated debts as the main reason for this motion, signed by him and 5 other bishops. On 11 September 1766, the Ecumenical Patriarch of Constantinople convinced the Sultan to abolish the Serbian Patriarchate of Peć and place its dioceses under the jurisdiction of Constantinople. That decision affected only Serbian dioceses under Ottoman rule, since Serbian Autonomous Metropolitanate of Karlovci in Habsburg monarchy remained out of reach of Constantinopolitan Phanariotes.

== See also ==
- List of heads of the Serbian Orthodox Church

Eastern Orthodox Church titles
| Preceded by Vasilije I | Serbian Patriarch; 1765–1766 | Vacant Title next held by Dimitrije |

== Sources ==
- Ćirković, Sima (2004). The Serbs. Malden: Blackwell Publishing.
- Fotić, Aleksandar (2008). "Serbian Orthodox Church". Encyclopedia of the Ottoman Empire. New York: Infobase Publishing. pp. 519–520.
- Kašić, Dušan, ed. (1965). Serbian Orthodox Church: Its past and present. Vol. 1. Belgrade: Serbian Orthodox Church.
- Kiminas, Demetrius (2009). The Ecumenical Patriarchate: A History of Its Metropolitanates with Annotated Hierarch Catalogs. Wildside Press LLC.
- Pavlovich, Paul (1989). The History of the Serbian Orthodox Church. Serbian Heritage Books.
- Слијепчевић, Ђоко М. (1962). Историја Српске православне цркве (History of the Serbian Orthodox Church). Vol. књ. 1. Минхен: Искра.
- Вуковић, Сава (1996). Српски јерарси од деветог до двадесетог века (Serbian Hierarchs from the 9th to the 20th Century). Београд: Евро.
