= Patriarch Vikentije =

Patriarch Vikentije may refer to:

- Serbian Patriarch Vikentije I, Archbishop of Peć and Serbian Patriarch (1758)
- Serbian Patriarch Vikentije II, Archbishop of Peć and Serbian Patriarch (1950–1958)
