= Vikentije I =

Serbian Patriarch

- Archbishop of Peć and Serbian Patriarch
- Church: Serbian Patriarchate of Peć
- See: Patriarchate of Peć Monastery
- Installed: 1758
- Term ended: 1758
- Predecessor: Gavrilo III
- Successor: Pajsije II

Personal details
- Denomination: Eastern Orthodoxy

Vikentije I Stefanović (Serbian Cyrillic: Викентије I Стефановић) was the Patriarch of the Serbian Patriarchate of Peć for a short time during 1758.

During the Habsburg rule in the Kingdom of Serbia, Vikentije served as archdeacon of Metropolitan Vikentije Jovanović of Belgrade (1731–1737). After Ottoman reconquest of Belgrade in 1739, Vikentije Stefanović decided to stay in Serbia, and rose through ecclesiastical ranks, becoming Metropolitan of Belgrade in 1753, under Patriarch Gavrilo III. Between 1755 and 1758, Patriarch Gavrilo III was challenged by several rivals and finally lost the patriarchal throne. From that turmoil, metropolitan Vikentije finally emerged as new Serbian Patriarch. His tenure was very short. Upon arriving to Constantinople, he was struck with sudden illness and died. His successor was Metropolitan of Užice and Valjevo Pajsije, who traveled with him to Constantinople, becoming new Serbian Patriarch as Pajsije II.

== See also ==
- List of heads of the Serbian Orthodox Church

Eastern Orthodox Church titles
Preceded by Gavrilo III	Serbian Patriarch; 1758	Succeeded by Pajsije II

== Sources ==
- Ćirković, Sima (2004). The Serbs. Malden: Blackwell Publishing. ISBN 9781405142915.
- Fotić, Aleksandar (2008). "Serbian Orthodox Church". Encyclopedia of the Ottoman Empire. New York: Infobase Publishing. pp. 519–520. ISBN 9781438110257.
- Kašić, Dušan, ed. (1965). Serbian Orthodox Church: Its past and present. Vol. 1. Belgrade: Serbian Orthodox Church.
- Pavlovich, Paul (1989). The History of the Serbian Orthodox Church. Serbian Heritage Books. ISBN 9780969133124.
- Слијепчевић, Ђоко М. (1962). Историја Српске православне цркве (History of the Serbian Orthodox Church). Vol. књ. 1. Минхен: Искра.
- Вуковић, Сава (1996). Српски јерарси од деветог до двадесетог века (Serbian Hierarchs from the 9th to the 20th Century). Београд: Евро.
