= Joannicius III of Constantinople =

Ecumenical Patriarch of Constantinople from 1761 to 1763

Joannicius III of Constantinople Joanikije III
- Ecumenical Patriarch of Constantinople; Archbishop of Peć and Serbian Patriarch
- Church: Church of Constantinople; Serbian Patriarchate of Peć
- Installed: 1739 (as Serbian Patriarch); 26 March 1761 (as Patriarch of Constantinople)
- Term ended: 1746 (as Serbian Patriarch); 21 May 1763 (as Patriarch of Constantinople)
- Predecessor: Arsenije IV Jovanović Šakabenta (as Serbian Patriarch); Seraphim II of Constantinople (as Patriarch of Constantinople)
- Successor: Atanasije II Gavrilović (as Serbian Patriarch); Samuel of Constantinople (as Patriarch of Constantinople)
- Previous post: Metropolitan of Chalcedon (1747–1761)

Personal details
- Born: Ioannis Karatzas c. 1700
- Died: 1793 Monastery of Halki
- Denomination: Eastern Orthodoxy

Joannicius III of Constantinople (Greek: Ἰωαννίκιος; Serbian: Јоаникије III; c. 1700 – 1793) was Archbishop of Peć and Serbian Patriarch from 1739 to 1746 and Ecumenical Patriarch of Constantinople from 1761 to 1763. The ordinal number of his title is III both for his office as Serbian Patriarch and of Constantinople.

== Life ==
Ioannis Karatzas was born in circa 1700 and belonged to the influential Phanariote family Caradja (Karatzas), of Byzantine Greek origin. He became a deacon serving Patriarch Paisius II of Constantinople and later he was appointed protosyncellus.

With the 1739 Treaty of Belgrade which ended the Russo-Turkish War (1735–1739), the Kingdom of Serbia ceased to exist. The Ottoman sultan deposed Serbian Patriarch Arsenije IV who sided with the Habsburg monarchy during the war, and in his place appointed the Greek Joannicius, who took the title of Archbishop of Peć and Serbian Patriarch. Among the Serbs, he was known as Joanikije (Јоаникије), and it was recorded at the time that he was appointed by "the mighty [rule of the] Turk, and not by election at the [Serbian] sabor (assembly)". The previous patriarch Arsenije IV moved to the Habsburg monarchy along with many Serbs, in what is known as the Second Great Serb Migration. Arsenije IV became Metropolitan of Karlovci, maintaining however deep connections with the Serbs who remained in the Ottoman Empire under the jurisdiction of Joannicius. Joannicius remained Serbian Patriarch until 1746, when, burdened with debts due to his high-living, he was forced to sell the title to pay his creditors.

After returning to Constantinople, in September 1747 he obtained an appointment as Metropolitan of Chalcedon. On 26 March 1761, he was elected Ecumenical Patriarch of Constantinople, an office he maintained until 21 May 1763, when he was deposed and exiled to Mount Athos.

Thanks to the support of his family, Joannicius III returned from exile and obtained the revenue from the monastery of the island of Halki near Constantinople, where he died in 1793.

== Bibliography ==
- R. Aubert (2000). "Joannikios III". Dictionnaire d'histoire et de géographie ecclésiastiques. Vol. 27. Paris: Letouzey et Ané. 1379-1380. ISBN 2-7063-0210-0.
- Fotić, Aleksandar (2008). "Serbian Orthodox Church". Encyclopedia of the Ottoman Empire. New York: Infobase Publishing. pp. 519–520. ISBN 9781438110257.
- Kašić, Dušan, ed. (1965). Serbian Orthodox Church - Its past and present. Vol. 1. Belgrade: Serbian Orthodox Church.
- Kiminas, Demetrius (2009). The Ecumenical Patriarchate - A History of Its Metropolitanates with Annotated Hierarch Catalogs. Wildside Press. ISBN 9781434458766.
- Мирковић, Мирко (1965). Правни положај и карактер Српске цркве под турском влашћу (1459–1766). Београд: Завод за издавање уцбеника.
- Pavlovich, Paul (1989). The History of the Serbian Orthodox Church. Serbian Heritage Books. ISBN 9780969133124.
- Слијепчевић, Ђоко М. (1962). Историја Српске православне цркве (History of the Serbian Orthodox Church). Vol. књ. 1. Минхен: Искра.
- Вуковић, Сава (1996). Српски јерарси од деветог до двадесетог века (Serbian Hierarchs from the 9th to the 20th Century). Београд: Евро.

Eastern Orthodox Church titles
Preceded by Seraphim II	Ecumenical Patriarch of Constantinople; 1761 – 1763	Succeeded by Samuel
