= Kirilo I of Serbia =

Serbian Patriarch

Kirilo I or Saint Kirilo of Serbia, was the Patriarch of the Serbian Patriarchate of Peć from 1407 to 1419.

Kirilo became head of the Serbian Patriarchate of Peć after the death of Patriarch Danilo IV at a time when medieval Serbia was still recovering from the Battle of Kosovo and the young despot Stefan Lazarević was facing vaiorus enemies.

According to one chronicle, Patriarch Kirilo died between 1 September 1418 and 31 August 1419, and in one prologue the date of death of Patriarch Kirilo was stated 27 December 1418.

He is venerated on 12 September.

== See also ==
- List of saints of the Serbian Orthodox Church
- List of heads of the Serbian Orthodox Church
