= Teofan I =

Serbian Patriarch

Teofan I was the Patriarch of the Serbian Patriarchate of Peć from 1435 to 1446.He was succeeded by Nikodim II.

Teofan was the abbot of the Rakovac Monastery before being elevated to bishop and later elected patriarch.

== See also ==
- List of heads of the Serbian Orthodox Church

== Sources ==
- Народна енциклопедија (National Encyclopedia, 1927)
- Вуковић, Сава (1996). Српски јерарси од деветог до двадесетог века. Евро, Унирекс, Каленић. (In translation Sava, Vuković (1996). Serbian Hierarchs from the Ninth- to the Twentieth-century. Evro, Unireks, Kalenić.)
