= Patriarch Kalinik =

Patriarch Kalinik may refer to:

- Kalinik I, Serbian Patriarch in 1691–1710
- Kalinik II, Serbian Patriarch in 1765–1766
