= Nikodimos =

Nikodim is a masculine given name. It is a variant of the given name Nicodemus. Notable people withe the name include:

- Nikodimos Kabarnos
- Nikodimos Papavasiliou
- Nikodimos of Ierissos

== See also ==
- See "Nicodemus" for other variants
