= Sava V =

Serbian Patriarch

Sava V (Serbian Cyrillic: Сава V) was the Patriarch of the Serbian Patriarchate of Peć in the period of 1396–1406. Upon his death, he was succeeded by Danilo IV, holding office only briefly, for a year (1406–07).

== See also ==
- List of heads of the Serbian Orthodox Church

Preceded by Danilo III	Serbian Patriarch; 1396–1406	Succeeded by Danilo IV

== Sources ==
- Purković, Miodrag (1976). Srpski patrijarsi Srednjega veka. Srpska pravoslavna eparhija zapadnoevropska.
- Sava of Šumadija (1996). Srpski jerarsi: od devetog do dvadesetog veka. Evro.
