= Ioseb =

Ioseb (Georgian: იოსებ) is a Georgian given name and may refer to:

- Ioseb Abakelia (1882–1938), pioneering Georgian physician and medical scholar, specializing in phthisiatry
- Catholicos Ioseb of Abkhazia (1739–1776), Georgian Orthodox hierarch, Metropolitan Bishop of Gelati and Catholicos of Abkhazia
- Ioseb Bardanashvili (born 1948 in Georgia), Israeli and Georgian composer
- Ioseb Chakhvashvili (born 1993), Georgian Football Midfielder
- Ioseb Chugoshvili (born 1986), amateur Belarusian Greco-Roman wrestler of Georgian origin,
- Ioseb Dzhugashvili (Birth name of Joseph Stalin) (1878–1953), Georgian revolutionary and later Soviet political leader and dictator
- Ioseb Grishashvili, pen name of Ioseb Mamulishvili (1889–1965), poet and historian from Georgia
- Ioseb Iremashvili (1878–1944), Georgian politician and author
- Ioseb Kechakmadze (1939–2013), Georgian composer

== See also ==
- Joseph
