= Nikodimos Kabarnos =

Greek cantor and priest (born 1980)

Archimandrite Nikodimos Kabarnos
- Νικόδημος Καβαρνός
- Born: 14 May 1980 (age 46); Plomari, Lesbos, Greece
- Citizenship: Greek
- Education: Pontifical Oriental Institute
- Occupations: Priest and cantor
- Known for: Byzantine music

Ecclesiastical career
- Religion: Christianity
- Church: Greek Orthodox Church
- Ordained: 2 February 2009
- Website: www.byzmusic.gr

Archimandrite Nikodimos Kabarnos (Greek: Νικόδημος Καβαρνός; born 14 May 1980) is a Greek Orthodox priest and cantor known for his performing, teaching, and directing of Byzantine music.

== Early life ==
Nikodimos Kabarnos was born in May 14, 1980 in Plomari, Lesbos. He grew up in Mytilene, where he completed his secondary education. He is the firstborn child in a large Greek family. He studied Byzantine music under the protopsaltes (leading cantor) George Michalis. He became a professional cantor when he was 13 years old, and at the age of 15 received an award in Byzantine music from the Greek Ministry of Education. He subsequently moved to Athens.

== Education ==
He studied theology at the Higher Ecclesiastical School of Athens and at the Theological School of the University of Athens. He then studied Music Technology at the Department of Music Technology and Musical Instruments at the Technological Educational Institute of the Ionian Islands, as well as Direction, Sound Engineering and Sound Technology at the Athens Technical College and the Athens Concert Hall Studio. In 2014, he received his PhD in Religious Communication from the Pontifical Oriental Institute in Rome.

In addition to his musical studies, he holds degrees in Advanced Theory of European Music (Harmony, Counterpoint and Composition), and he also holds a degree and diploma in Byzantine Music.

== Priesthood ==
On 27 January 2009, he was ordained as a deacon. Two weeks later, on 2 February 2009, he was ordained as a presbyter, also receiving the title of Archimandrite.

He began as a deacon at the Metamorphosis church of Moschato, then as a priest at Agios Georgios in Athens. Currently, he serves as Superior and at the Holy Church of the Ascension in Neos Kosmos, Athens.

== Teaching and choir activities ==
At the age of 20, Father Nikodimos established a Byzantine music school where he trained over two hundred students. Selecting from the school's students, Father Nikodimos created a Byzantine music choir, which had about 40 people at a time. He also taught Byzantine music at the National and Kapodistrian University of Athens, the Pontifical Gregorian University, the University of Perugia, and Greek College, Rome.

== Discography ==
His albums include:

- Paraklitikos kanon eis ton Timion Stavron
- Ymnoi Xristougennon protohronias & Theofanion
- Concert of Byzantine Ecclesiastical Music in Patriarchate of Serbia
- O gliki mou Ear
