= List of heads of the Serbian Orthodox Church =

This is a list of heads of the Serbian Orthodox Church, since the establishment of the church as an autocephalous archbishopric in 1219 to the contemporary patriarchate. The list includes all the archbishops and patriarchs that led the Serbian Orthodox Church, including the Serbian Archbishopric and Serbian Patriarchate of Peć. Since 1920, the Church is led by the Serbian Patriarch, officially styled as Archbishop of Peć, Metropolitan of Belgrade and Karlovci, and Serbian Patriarch.

The current patriarch is Porfirije, who acceded to the position in 2021.

== Legend ==
Venerated to sainthood

== Serbian Archbishopric (1219–1346) ==
No.	Primate	Portrait	Tenure	Notes
1	Sava I Сава I Sabbas I		1219–1233	First Archbishop of the Serbian Church. Styled "Archbishop of Serb Lands and the Littoral". Established seat at Žiča.
2	Arsenije I Арсеније I Arsenius I		1233–1263	Moved the seat to Peć.
3	Sava II; Сава II; Sabbas II		1263–1271	
4	Danilo I Данило I Daniel I		1271–1272	
5	Joanikije I Јоаникије I Joannicius I		1272–1276	
Seat vacant from 1276 to 1279
6	Jevstatije I Јевстатије I Eustathius I		1279 – 4 January 1286	Moved the seat to Žiča in 1285.
7	Jakov; Јаков; Jacob		1286–1292	Moved the seat to Peć in 1291 amid foreign invasion, likely final transfer.
8	Jevstatije II; Јевстатије II; Eustathius II		1292–1309	
9	Sava III; Сава III; Sabbas III		1309–1316	Styled "Archbishop of All Serb and Maritime Lands".
10	Nikodim I Никодим I Nicodemus I		1316–1324	
11	Danilo II; Данило II; Daniel II		1324–1337	
12	Joanikije II; Јоаникије II; Joannicius II		3 January 1338 – 6 April 1346	

== Serbian Patriarchate of Peć (1346–1766) ==
No.	Primate	Portrait	Tenure	Notes
1	Joanikije II; Јоаникије II; Joannicius II		6 April 1346 – 3 September 1354	First Patriarch of the Serbian Church. Styled "Archbishop of Peć and Patriarch of all Serb Lands and the Littoral".
2	Sava IV; Сава IV; Sabbas IV		1354–1375	
3	Jefrem I Јефрем I Ephraem I		3 October 1375 – 1380	
4	Spiridon I Спиридон I Spyridon I		1380 – 11 August 1389	
(3)	Jefrem I Јефрем I Ephraem I		1389–1390	
5	Danilo III; Данило III; Daniel III		1390–1396	
6	Sava V Сава V Sabbas V		1396–1406	
7	Danilo IV; Данило IV; Daniel IV		1406	
8	Kirilo I Кирило I Cyril I		1407–1419	
9	Nikon I Никон I Nicon I		1420–1435	
10	Teofan I Теофан I Theophanes I		1435–1446	
11	Nikodim II; Никодим II; Nicodemus II		1446–1455	
12	Arsenije II; Арсеније II; Arsenius II		1457–1463	
Seat vacant from 1463 to 1557 due to Ottoman abolition and transfer of jurisdiction to the Archbishopric of Ohrid
No.	Primate	Portrait	Tenure	Notes
13	Makarije I Макарије I Macarius I		1557–1571	Full styled "Archbishop of Peć and Patriarch of Serbs and Bulgarians"; Basic styled "Archbishop of Peć and Serbian Patriarch".
14	Antonije I Антоније I Anthony I		1571–1575	
15	Gerasim I Герасим I Gerasimus I		1575–1586	
16	Savatije I Саватије I Sabbatios I		1586	
17	Nikanor I Никанор I Nicanor I		1588	
18	Jerotej I Јеротеј I Hieroteos I		1589–1590	
19	Filip I Филип I Philip I		1591–1592	
20	Jovan II; Јован II; John II		1592–1613	
21	Pajsije I Пајсије I Paisius I		1614–1647	
22	Gavrilo I Гаврило I Gabriel I		1648–1655	
23	Maksim I Максим I Maxim I		1655–1674	
24	Arsenije III; Арсеније III; Arsenius III		1674–1690 (1706)	Leader of the First Migration of the Serbs into the Habsburg monarchy. After 1690, reorganized and headed the branch of the Serbian Church in the Habsburg monarchy.
25	Kalinik I Калиник I Callinicus I		1691–1710	Ethnic Greek.
26	Atanasije I Атанасије I Athanasius I		1711–1712	
27	Mojsije I Мојсије I Moses I		1712–1724	
28	Arsenije IV; Арсеније IV; Arsenius IV		1724–1737	Leader of the Second Migration of the Serbs into the Habsburg monarchy.
29	Joanikije III; Јоаникије III; Joannicius III		1739–1746	Ethnic Greek. Served as the Ecumenical Patriarch of Constantinople.
30	Atanasije II; Атанасије II; Athanasius II		1746–1752	
31	Gavrilo II; Гаврило II; Gabriel II		1752	
32	Gavrilo III; Гаврило III; Gabriel III		1752–1758	
33	Vikentije I Викентије I Vicentius I		1758	
34	Pajsije II; Пајсије II; Paisius II		1758	Ethnic Greek.
35	Gavrilo IV; Гаврило IV; Gabriel IV		1758	Ethnic Greek.
36	Kirilo II; Кирило II; Cyril II		1758–1763	Ethnic Greek.
37	Vasilije; Василије; Basil		1763–1765	
38	Kalinik II; Калиник II; Callinicus II		1765–1766	Ethnic Greek. Resigned as Patriarch, effectively abolishing the post.
Seat vacant from 1766 to 1920 due to Ottoman abolition
After the Ottoman Empire abolished the Serbian Patriarchate of Peć for the second and final time in 1766, the Serbian Orthodox population within the Ottoman Empire was under jurisdiction of the Ecumenical Patriarchate of Constantinople until 1920. Due to the Great Turkish War, a large number of Serbs migrated to the Habsburg monarchy in 1690 causing the establishment of a metropolitanate in Karlovci in 1708. This see was elevated to a patriarchate in 1848. After the founding of the Principality of Serbia, the autonomous Metropolitanate of Belgrade was created in 1831, under jurisdiction of the Ecumenical Patriarchate of Constantinople. It gained full autocephaly in 1879 and merged in 1920 with the Patriarchate of Karlovci and the Metropolitanate of Montenegro to form the unified Serbian Orthodox Church.

== Serbian Orthodox Church (since 1920) ==
No.	Primate	Portrait	Tenure			Notes
39	Dimitrije; Димитрије; Demetrius		12 September 1920	6 April 1930	9 years, 6 months and 25 days	First Patriarch of the reunified Serbian Orthodox Church. Styled "Archbishop of Peć, Metropolitan of Belgrade and Karlovci, and Serbian Patriarch"
40	Varnava; Варнава; Barnabas		12 May 1930	23 July 1937	7 years, 2 months and 11 days	
41	Gavrilo V Гaврилo V Gabriel V		21 February 1938	7 May 1950	12 years, 2 months and 16 days	
42	Vikentije II; Викентије II; Vicentius II		1 July 1950	5 July 1958	8 years and 4 days	
43	German; Герман; Herman		14 September 1958	30 November 1990	32 years and 16 days	
44	Pavle; Павле; Paul		1 December 1990	15 November 2009	18 years, 11 months and 14 days	
45	Irinej; Иринеј; Irenaeus		23 January 2010	20 November 2020	10 years, 9 months and 28 days	
46	Porfirije; Порфирије; Porphyrios		19 February 2021	Incumbent	5 years, 8 months and 3 days (as of 22 October 2026)	

=== Timeline ===
This is a graphical timeline of the patriarchs of the Serbian Orthodox Church since 1920. They are listed in order of first assuming office.

The following chart lists the patriarchs by lifespan, with the years outside of their tenure in blue.

== See also ==
- Lists of patriarchs

== Sources ==
- Slijepčević, Djoko (1962). Историја Српске православне цркве (History of the Serbian Orthodox Church). Vol. књ. 1. Минхен: Искра.
- Slijepčević, Djoko (1966). Историја Српске православне цркве (History of the Serbian Orthodox Church). Vol. књ. 2. Минхен: Искра.
- Slijepčević, Djoko (1986). Историја Српске православне цркве (History of the Serbian Orthodox Church). Vol. књ. 3. Келн: Искра.
- Slijepčević, Đoko (2002). Istorija srpske pravoslavne crkve: Od pokrštavanja Srba do kraja XVIII veka. Култура. ISBN 978-86-7609-042-6.
- Bogdanović, Dimitrije (1972). Likovi svetitelja (in Serbian). Glavni savez udruženog pravoslavnog sveštenstva SFRJ.
- Dučić, Nićifor (1894). Istorija Srpske pravoslavne crkve od prvijeh desetina VII v. do naših dana (in Serbian). Drž. stamp Kralj. Srbije.
- Marjanović, Čedomir (2001). Istorija Srpske crkve. Ars Libri. ISBN 9788675880011.
- Miklosich, Franz (1858). Monumenta Serbica spectantia historiam Serbiae, Bosnae, Ragusii. Vienna: apud Guilelmum Braumüller.
- Pavlovich, Paul (1989). The History of the Serbian Orthodox Church. Serbian Heritage Books. ISBN 978-0-9691331-2-4.
- Sava, Bishop of Šumadija (1996). Srpski jerarsi: od devetog do dvadesetog veka (in Serbian). Evro.
- Šuletić, Nebojša (2021). "Usurpations of and Designated Successions to the Throne in the Serbian Patriarchate: The Case of Patriarch Moses Rajović (1712-24)" (PDF). Balcanica. 52: 47–67. Archived from the original (PDF) on 17 February 2022.
