= Patriarchate of Peć (monastery) =

Serbian Orthodox monastery near Peja, Kosovo

Patriarchate of Peć Monastery
- Манастир Пећка патријаршија (Serbian) Manastir Pećka patrijaršija (Serbian) Patrikana e Pejës (Albanian)
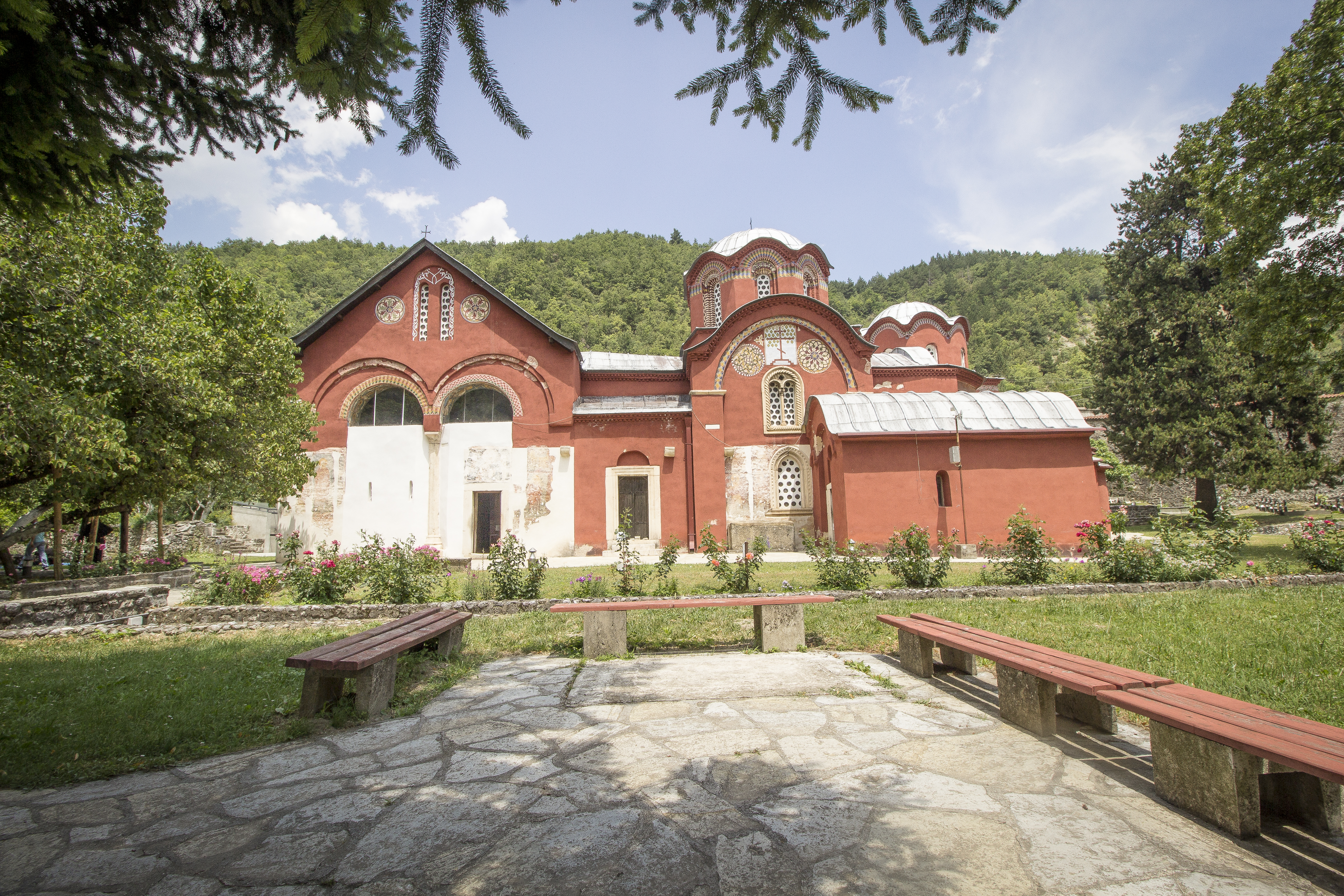
- The church complex of the monastery
- Interactive map of Patriarchate of Peć Monastery

Monastery information
- Denomination: Eastern Orthodox
- Established: 13th century
- Diocese: Eparchy of Raška and Prizren (just territorially, since monastery is under direct patriarchal (stavropegial) jurisdiction)
- Controlled churches: Church of the Apostles; Church of St. Demetrius; Church of the Virgin Hodegetria; Church of St. Nicholas

People
- Founders: Archbishop Sava, Archbishop Arsenije I
- Important associated figures: Archbishops Sava, Arsenije I, Nikodim I, Danilo II

Architecture
- Style: Serbo-Byzantine

Site
- Location: Near Peja (Serbian: Peć)
- Country: Kosovo
- Coordinates: 42.661°N 20.266°E
- Public access: Yes

The Patriarchate of Peć Monastery (Serbian: Манастир Пећка патријаршија, romanized: Manastir Pećka patrijaršija, pronounced [pɛ̂ːt͡ɕkaː patrijǎ(ː)rʃija]; Albanian: Patrikana e Pejës) is a medieval Serbian Orthodox monastery located near the city of Peja (Serbian: Peć), Kosovo. Built in the 13th century, it became the residence of Serbian Archbishops. It was expanded during the 14th century, and in 1346, when the Serbian Patriarchate of Peć was created, the monastery became the seat of Serbian Patriarchs. The monastery complex consists of four churches, and during medieval and early modern times it was also used as mausoleum of Serbian archbishops and patriarchs. The monastery church is unique in Serbian medieval architecture, with three churches connected as one whole, and a total of four churches. It is part of the "Medieval Monuments in Kosovo", a combined World Heritage Site along with three other monuments of the Serbian Orthodox Church.

The monastery has special (stavropegial) status, since it is under direct jurisdiction of the Serbian Patriarch whose title includes Archbishop of Peć. The enthronement ceremony of the newly elected Patriarch is traditionally held at the monastery, symbolizing continuity with the throne of Saint Sava.

== Geography ==
The monastery complex is located near Peja (or Peć), in the Metohija region in Kosovo, near the border with Montenegro. It is situated by the Peć Bistrica, at the entrance of the Rugova Canyon. A morus nigra tree, 750 years old, is preserved in the monastery yard, called Šam-dud (sr), planted by Archbishop Sava II between 1263 and 1272.

== History ==
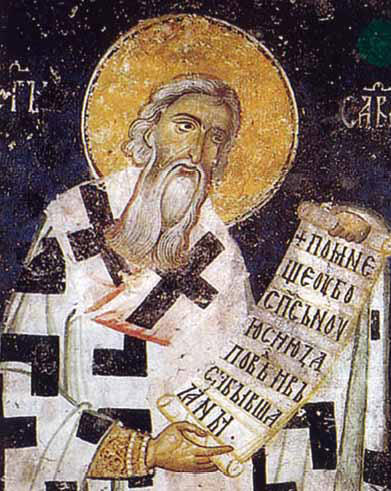
Saint Sava, one of the founders, fresco from the Church of the Holy Apostles

The monastery is located at the edges of an old Roman and Byzantine Siperant. The monastery complex, consisting of four churches, of which three churches connected as one whole, was built in the first third of the 13th century, 1321–1324, and 1330–1337. It is presumed that the site became a metochion (land owned and governed by a monastery) of the Žiča monastery, the seat of the Serbian Archbishopric at that time, while Archbishop Sava (d. 1235) was still alive.

In the first third of the 13th century, Archbishop Arsenije I (s. 1233–63) had the Church of the Holy Apostles built on the north side. That church was decorated on Arsenije's order in ca. 1250 or ca. 1260. In 1253, Arsenije I moved the Serbian Church seat from Žiča to Peć amid foreign invasion, to a more secure location, closer to the centre of the country. The Serbian Church seat was then shortly returned to Žiča in 1285, before being moved to Peja in 1291, again amid foreign invasion.

Archbishop Nikodim I (s. 1321–24) built the Church of St. Demetrius on the north side of the Church of the Holy Apostles, while his successor, Archbishop Danilo II (s. 1324–37) built the Church of the Holy Mother of God Hodegetria and the Church of St. Nicholas on the south side. In front of the three main churches, he then raised a monumental narthex. At the time of Archbishop Joanikije II, around 1345, the hitherto undecorated Church of St. Demetrius was decorated with frescoes. Serbian Emperor Stefan Dušan (r. 1331–1355) raised the Serbian Archbishopric to the patriarchal status in 1346, thus creating the Serbian Patriarchate of Peć.

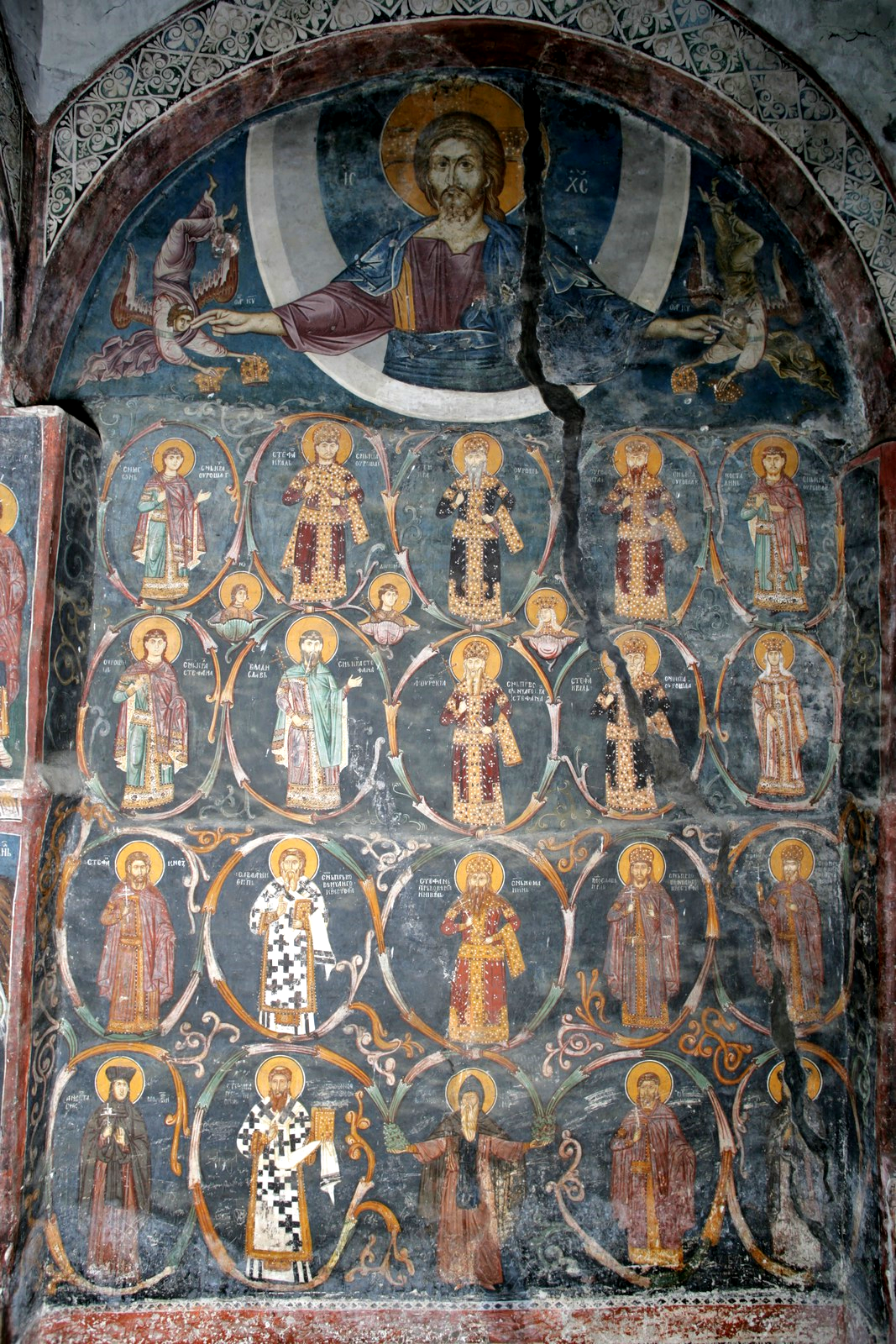
A fresco in Narthex depicting the Nemanjić tree.

During the 14th century, small modifications were made to Church of the Holy Apostles, so some parts were decorated later. From the 13th to the 15th century, and in the 17th century, the Serbian Archbishops and Serbian Patriarchs were buried in the churches of the Patriarchate. In 1459–63, after the death of Arsenije II, the patriarchate became vacant upon abolishment by the Ottoman Empire but was restored in 1557 during the reign of sultan Suleiman the Magnificent.

The re-establishment was done under the advice of grand vizier Sokollu Mehmed Pasha, while some of Bulgarian eparchies were also placed under its jurisdiction. Orthodox Albanians of Metohija were under the jurisdiction of the Patriachate of Peć.

Georgije Mitrofanović (1550–1630) painted new frescoes in the Church of St. Demetrius in 1619–20. In 1673–74 painter Radul painted the Church of St. Nicholas. In the early 18th century, and especially during and after the Austro-Russian–Turkish War (1735–1739), the patriarchate became the target of the Phanariotes and the Ecumenical Patriarchate of Constantinople, whose goal was to place the eparchies of the Serbian Patriarchate under its own jurisdiction. In 1737 the first Greek head of the Serbian Patriarchate was appointed after the intervention of Alexandros Mavrocordatos, who labeled the Serb leadership "untrustworthy". In the following years the Phanariotes embarked on policy initiatives that led to the exclusion of Serbs in the succession of the patriarchate, which was eventually abolished in September 1766.

The period of Ottoman rule in the region ended in 1912. At the beginning of the First Balkan War (1912–1913), the army of the Kingdom of Montenegro entered Peja (Serbian: Peć). By the Treaty of London (1913) the region of Peja was officially awarded to Montenegro and the Monastery of Peć again became an episcopal seat. Bishop Gavrilo Dožić of Peć (future Serbian Patriarch) initiated works on the monastery complex, but those efforts were halted, due to the breakout of the First World War (1914) and subsequent Austro-Hungarian occupation of Montenegro, including Peja. After World War I ended in 1918 Montenegro joined Kingdom of Serbia and South Slavic provinces of former Austria-Hungary formed the Kingdom of Serbs, Croats and Slovenians. In 1920, the structural unity of Serbian Orthodox Church was restored, and the Serbian Patriarchate was renewed, with a traditional primatial seat in the Patriarchal Monastery of Peć. Since then, all Serbian Patriarchs were enthroned in the Monastery.

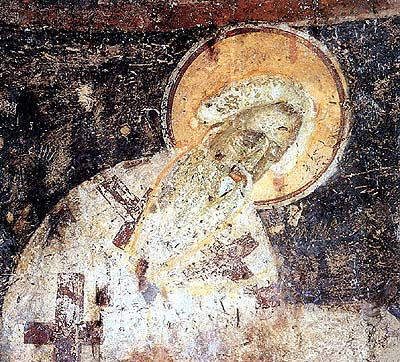
Arsenije Sremac, one of the founders, fresco from the Church of the Holy Apostles

Major reconstruction works in the Monastery were undertaken during 1931 and 1932. In 1947, the Patriarchate of Peć was added to Serbia's "Monument of Culture of Exceptional Importance" list, and on 13 July 2006 it was placed on UNESCO's World Heritage List as an extension of the Visoki Dečani site, which was overall placed on the List of World Heritage in Danger.

In March 2004, during the wave of ethnic violence in Kosovo, the Patriarchate was threatened but narrowly avoided destruction. The monastery complex was placed under increased protection by international peacekeeping forces, preventing it from being attacked. From 2004 onwards, the protection of the Patriarchate of Peć was primarily handled by NATO-led Kosovo Force (KFOR) troops. KFOR had been deployed in Kosovo since 1999 following UN Security Council Resolution 1244, tasked with maintaining a secure environment and safeguarding important sites, including Serbian Orthodox monasteries like the Patriarchate. This protection continued through the years, with KFOR troops ensuring the site remained unharmed, particularly during periods of ethnic tension. Over time, some responsibilities have been gradually transferred to the Kosovo Police, causing some concern among Serbs, who were wary of the transition. KFOR retained its protective role during the critical years after the March 2004 violence.

Restoration of the complex began in June 2006 and was completed in November 2006. The main aim was to protect the complex from the weather, as well as to repair the inner walls and exterior appearance. Two previously unknown frescoes were uncovered on the north facade of the Church of St. Demetrios, of a Serbian queen and nobleman. In 2008, the church facades were painted red, as Žiča, which led to some reactions.

== Mausoleum ==
Serbian Orthodox archbishops and patriarchs were ktetors of the monastery, and these were buried in its churches. The monastery is the greatest mausoleum of Serbian religious dignitaries. The monastery holds the relics of Serbian church leaders (most of whom are saints) Arsenije (s. 1233–63), Sava II (s. 1263–71), Jevstatije I (s. 1279–86), Nikodim I (s. 1316–24), Danilo II (s. 1324–37), Joanikije II (s. 1338–54), Jefrem (s. 1375–79; 1389–92), Spiridon (s. 1380–89) and Maksim I (s. 1655–74).

== Complex ==
=== Churches ===
Church	Image	Notes
Church of the Holy Apostles (Crkva sv. Apostola, also called Church of the Holy Saviour)		Built in the first third of the 13th century.
Church of St. Demetrius (Crkva sv. Dimitrija)		Built by 1324
Church of the Holy Mother of God Hodegetria (Crkva Bogorodice Odigitrije)		Built by 1337
Church of St. Nicholas (Crkva sv. Nikole)		Built by 1337. A small modest church built at the side of the Hodegetria Church.

=== Narthex ===
The three main churches with domes (Holy Apostles, St. Demetrius and Hodegetria) are connected with each other, linked by a joint monumental narthex, built by Archbishop Danilo II in the 14th century. His biography describes how he built a cathechumena above the narthex, as well as a large tower in front of the church. Now from the tower is left only its foundation, whereas the narthex is in good state. Initially the narthex was designated to be a porch, open on three sides. Two columns and three pillars support the narthex, upon which the vault rests. The narthex is decorated with frescoes in 1330. Their original beauty has partially faded though, as, in 1560, an external arch of the facade had to be walled up because of decay of the structure. Conservation efforts have not been successful in preserving old frescoes which are now in internal surfaces of the walls.

Against the Eastern wall of the narthex and near the Church of the Holy Apostles is placed a marbled Throne of St. Sava. The throne was used by Serbian archbishops and patriarchs when presiding over ecclesiastical assemblies, held in the narthex. A 1375 painting of St. Sava, placed over the throne, decorates the pilaster near the entrance of the church. St. Sava here is represented with ceremonious garments and an ornate mitre. The painting is considered unusual, as the historical truth of St. Sava not being an ordained bishop is purposefully neglected by the artist, who has also reflected over the struggle of the Church of Serbia with Constantinople for the recognition of its independence.

In the narthex can be found the tomb of patriarch Makarije. His figure can be shown in a pilaster on the East wall. In that fresco Makarije addresses a prayer, written on a scroll, to the St Mary and Christ, both of which are shown in the next pilasters.

Out of all the original frescoes that existed at the time of Archbishop Danilo II, the ones that have survived are all in the South-East Corner of the narthex, predominantly on the East wall, the most remarkable of which is the Tree of the Nemanjić dynasty, which shows the members of the Nemanja family from Stefan Nemanja to the then living Stefan Dusan. The fresco lists the family in four horizontal rows and emphasizes the vertical zone in the middle which shows, from bottom to top, Stefan Nemanja, Stefan the First-Crowned, Uros I, and King Milutin, with his son Stefan Dečanski and grandson Dušan at his side. Above the entrance of the Church of the Holy Mother of God is a painting of Archbishop Danilo II, represented as a young man who, along with St. Nicholas, pays homage to the monumental figure of the Virgin, represented as the Fountain of Life.

The Danilo II era frescos of the narthex are the work of two masters, one of them being described by Petković as having an indifferent sense of color and neglectful of the treatment of the uncovered parts of the body, and the other, who has worked in the lower zones of the wall, described as a better draughtsman, and who has emphasized the lower volume of his figures. The facades of the narthex are greatly damaged, although some figures of saints and some other compositions can still be distinguished. The paintings on the Southern side of the narthex, below the original porch, which has now disappeared, represent a scene showing the birth of a saint.

The remaining frescoes of the narthex were all painted in 1565, upon the Church of Serbia being restored and Makarije being the founder. They represent a rich repertoire of famous monks. In the Northern side of the West wall can be seen Peter of Koriša, Prohor of Pčinja, John of Rila, Saint Joachim of Osogovo and Sarandapor, Gabriel of Lesnovo, and Joanikije of Devič, as well as some archbishops and patriarchs. The West section of the narthex also includes Christ's teachings and parables. The Eastern side of the vault includes a representation of the Calendar with 365 figures and scenes, one for each day of the year. The Northern side of the vault represents the first seven ecumenical councils.

Although the 16th century paintings are considered lower in value than the 14th century ones, they are still considered as some of the most important achievements in paintings in the area. A certain Andreja signed himself on the shield of St. Demetrius's church entrance, and seems to have been the main painter. In addition Zograf Longin, a Serbian monk and painter, worked with the group of painters.

Two more paintings, both dated 1875 and representing Angelina of Serbia and Archangel Michael, decorate the West wall near the main entrance to the narthex. At the time of their painting, they replaced other frescoes of inferior quality.

== Gallery ==
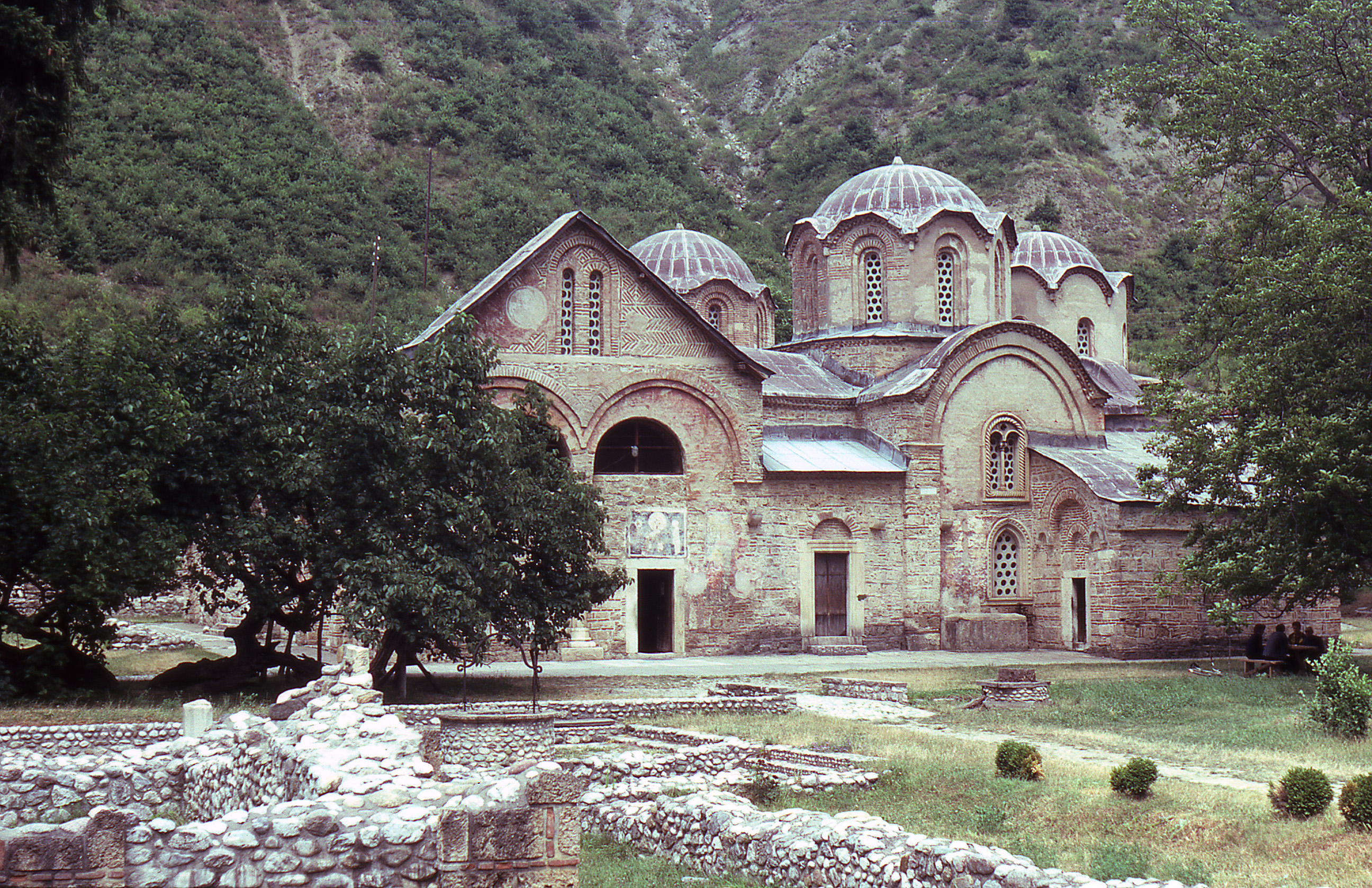
Photograph from June 1980

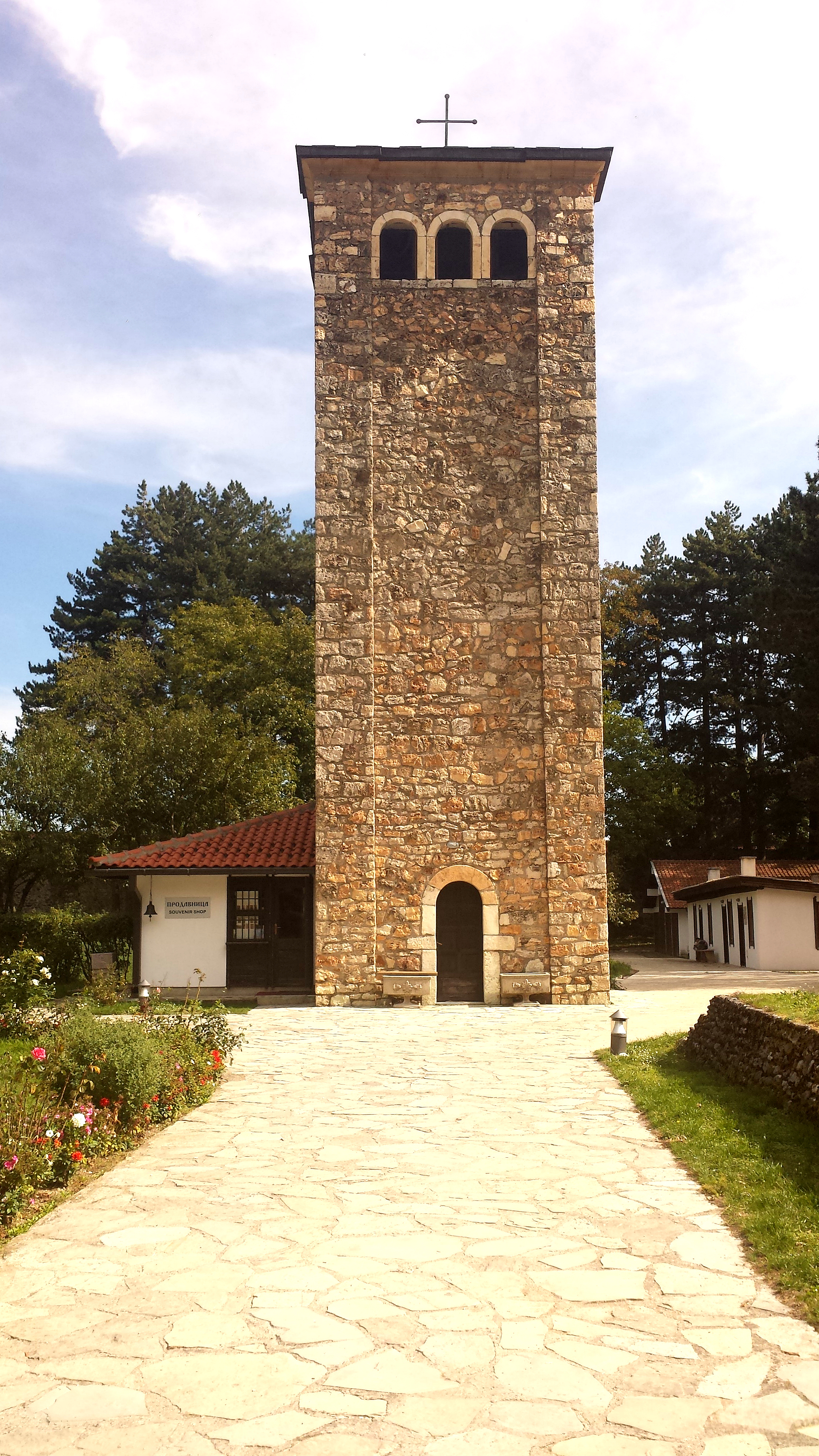
Tower in the monastery yard

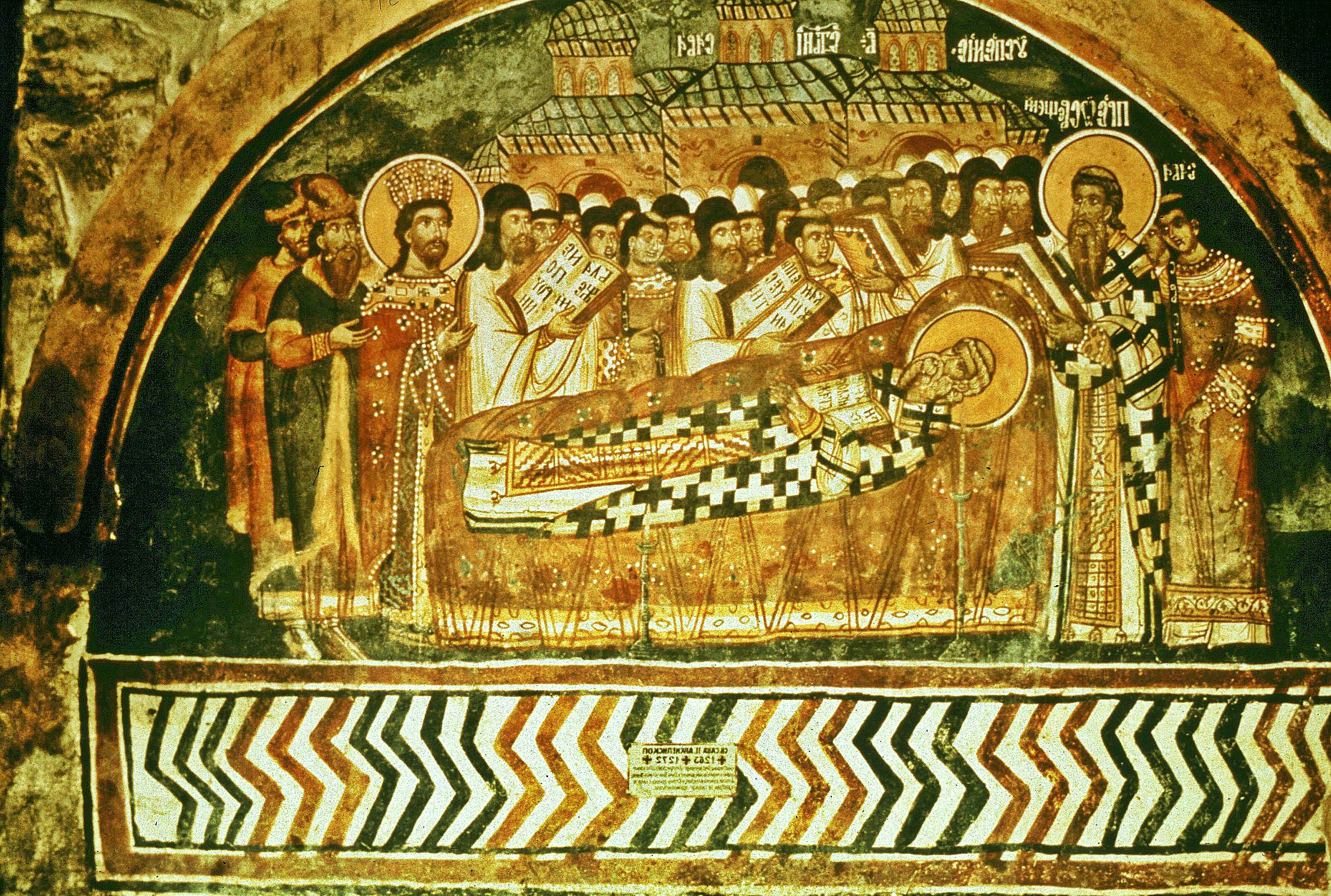
Burial of Sava II

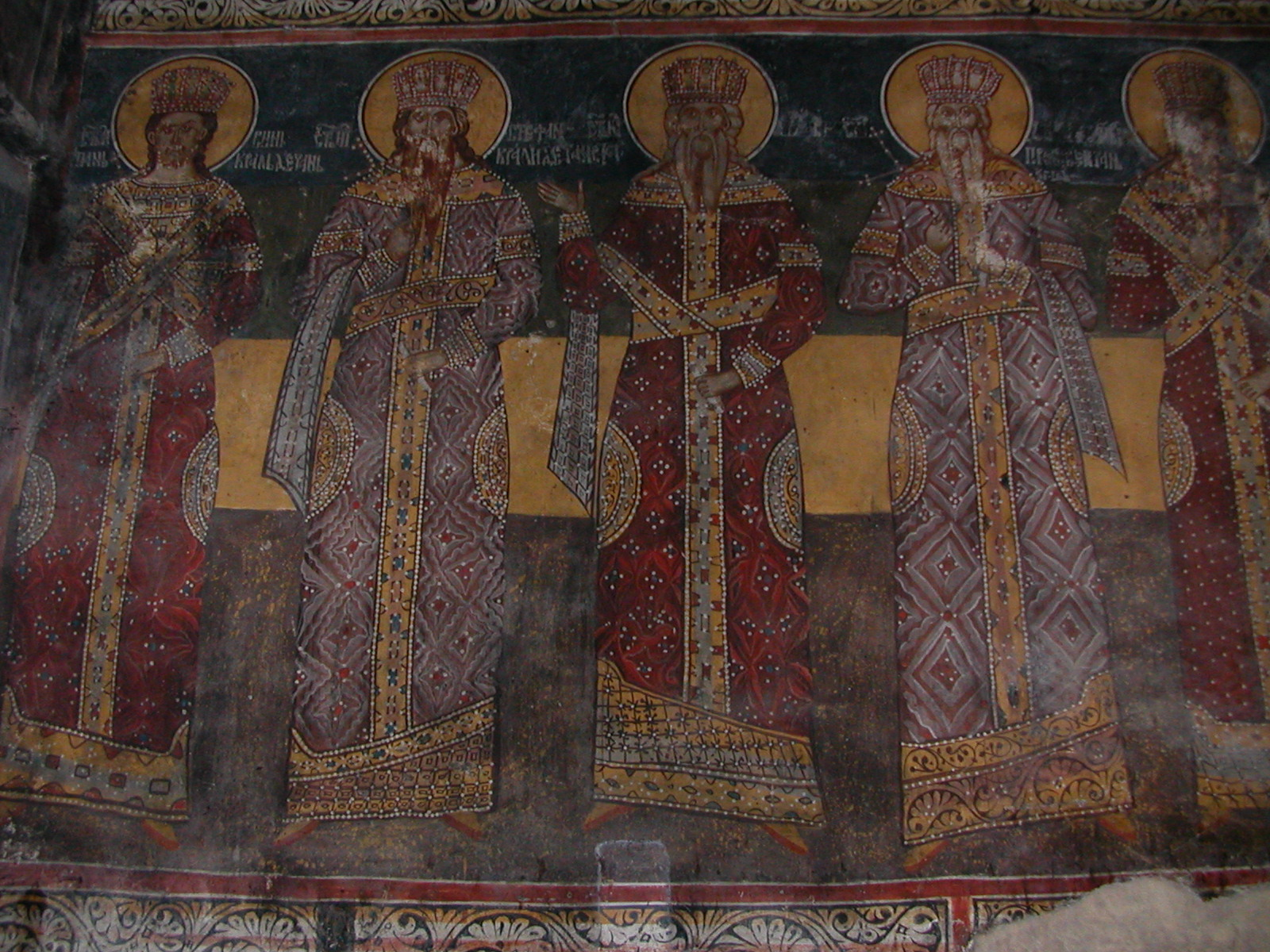
Fresco of the Nemanjić dynasty

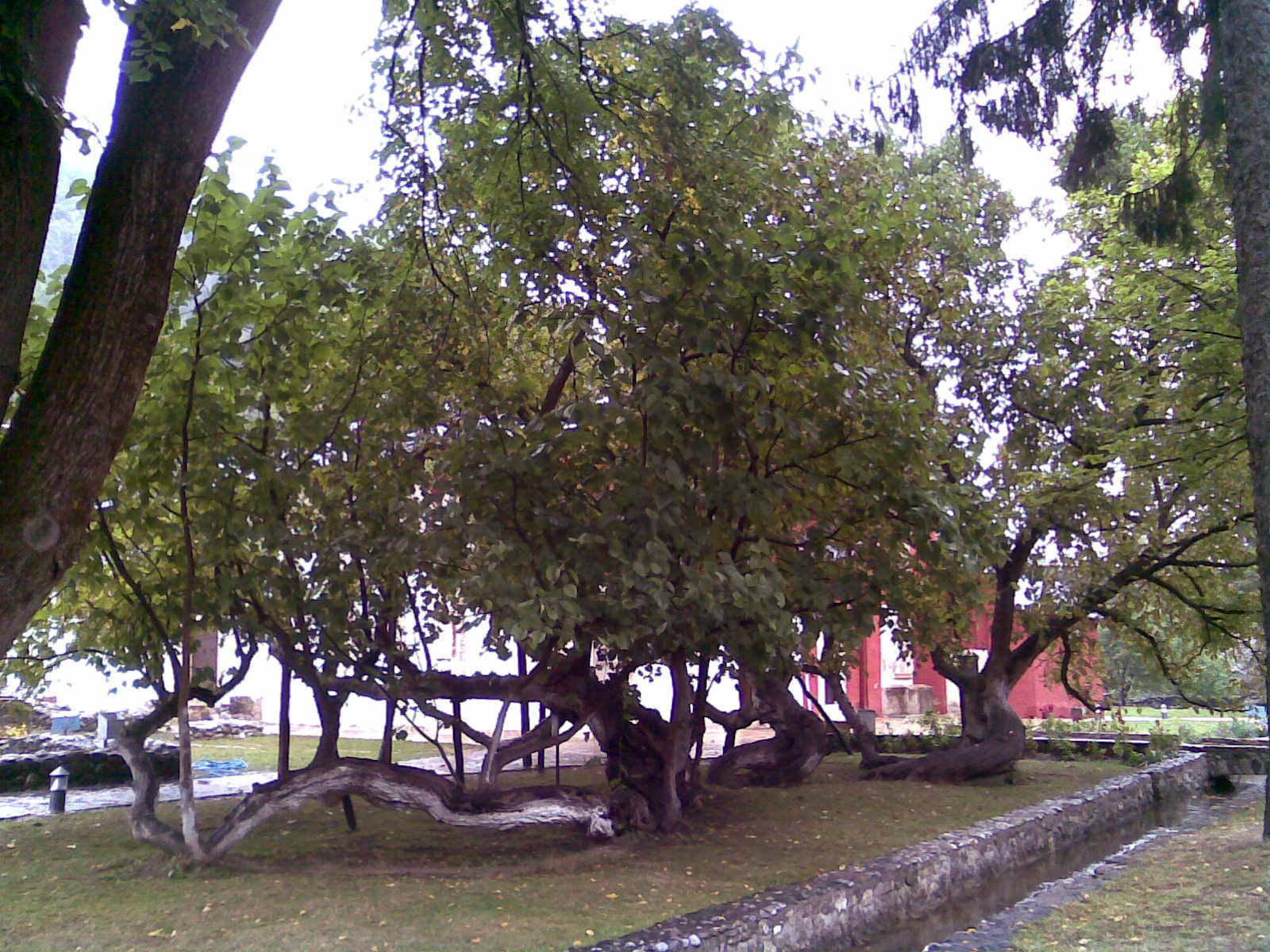
Šam-dud, a 750-year-old tree

== See also ==
- List of Serbian Orthodox monasteries

== Sources ==
- Базић, Миљојко М. (2007). Идентитет и културно наслеђе Срба. Београд: Научна КМД. ISBN 978-86-84153-82-3.
- Čanak-Medić, Milka; Todić, Branislav (2017). The Monastery of the Patriarchate of Peć. Novi Sad: Platoneum, Beseda. ISBN 978-86-85869-83-9.
- Ćirković, Sima (2004). The Serbs. Malden: Blackwell Publishing. ISBN 9781405142915.
- Curta, Florin (2006). Southeastern Europe in the Middle Ages, 500–1250. Cambridge: Cambridge University Press.
- Đorđević, Života; Pejić, Svetlana, eds. (1999). Cultural Heritage of Kosovo and Metohija. Belgrade: Institute for the Protection of Cultural Monuments of the Republic of Serbia. ISBN 978-86-80879-16-1.
- Ђурић, Војислав Ј.; Ћирковић, Сима; Кораћ, Војислав (1990). Пећка патријаршија. Београд-Приштина: Југословенска ревија, Јединство. ISBN 978-86-7413-057-5.
- Ерић, Слободан (2006). Косово и Метохија: Аргументи за останак у Србији. Београд: Удружење грађана Цер. ISBN 978-86-86619-00-6.
- Ferrari, Silvio; Benzo, Andrea (2014). Between Cultural Diversity and Common Heritage: Legal and Religious Perspectives on the Sacred Places of the Mediterranean. London & New York: Routledge. ISBN 9781317175032.
- Fine, John Van Antwerp Jr. (1994) [1987]. The Late Medieval Balkans: A Critical Survey from the Late Twelfth Century to the Ottoman Conquest. Ann Arbor, Michigan: University of Michigan Press. ISBN 0-472-08260-4.
- Fotić, Aleksandar (2008). "Serbian Orthodox Church". Encyclopedia of the Ottoman Empire. New York: Infobase Publishing. pp. 519–520. ISBN 9781438110257.
- Frazee, Charles A. (1969). The Orthodox Church and Independent Greece 1821-1852. Cambridge: Cambridge University Press.
- Janićijević, Jovan, ed. (1998). The Cultural Treasury of Serbia. Belgrade: IDEA, Vojnoizdavački zavod, Markt system. ISBN 978-86-7547-039-7.
- Јанковић, Марија (1985). Епископије и митрополије Српске цркве у средњем веку (Bishoprics and Metropolitanates of Serbian Church in Middle Ages). Београд: Историјски институт САНУ.
- Kia, Mehrdad (2011). Daily Life in the Ottoman Empire. Santa Barbara, California: Greenwood Press. ISBN 978-0-313-06402-9.
- Коматина, Ивана (2016). Црква и држава у српским земљама од XI до XIII века. Београд: Историјски институт. ISBN 978-86-7743-113-6.
- Krstić, Branislav (2003). Saving the Cultural Heritage of Serbia and Europe in Kosovo and Metohia. Belgrade: Coordination Center of the Federal Government and the Government of the Republic of Serbia for Kosovo and Metohia. ISBN 978-86-7556-017-3.
- Ljubinković, Radivoje (1975). The Church of the Apostles in the Patriarchate of Peć. Belgrade: Jugoslavija.
- McAllester, Matthew (2001). Beyond the Mountains of the Damned: The War Inside Kosovo. New York-London: New York University Press.
- Мијовић, Павле (1960). Пећка Патријаршија. Београд: Туристичка штампа.
- Милеуснић, Слободан (2007). Водич кроз манастире у Србији. Београд: МСТ Гајић, Завод за унапређивање образовања и васпитања.
- Pavlovich, Paul (1989). The History of the Serbian Orthodox Church. Serbian Heritage Books.
- Pavlowitch, Stevan K. (2002). Serbia: The History behind the Name. London: Hurst & Company.
- Petković, Sreten (1982). The Patriarchate of Peć. Belgrade: Serbian Patriarchate.
- Petković, Sreten (2023). The Patriarchate of Peć. Belgrade: Serbian Patriarchate.
- Popović, Svetlana (2002). "The Serbian Episcopal sees in the thirteenth century (Српска епископска седишта у XIII веку)". Старинар (51: 2001): 171–184.
- Слијепчевић, Ђоко М. (1962). Историја Српске православне цркве (History of the Serbian Orthodox Church). Vol. књ. 1. Минхен: Искра.
- Subotić, Gojko (1975). The Church of St. Demetrius in the Patriarchate of Peć. Belgrade: Jugoslavija.
- Subotić, Gojko (1998). Art of Kosovo: The Sacred Land. New York: The Monacelli Press. ISBN 978-1-58093-006-2.
- Todić, Branislav (1999). Serbian Medieval Painting: The Age of King Milutin. Belgrade: Draganić. ISBN 978-86-441-0271-7.
- Tomasevich, Jozo (2001). War and Revolution in Yugoslavia, 1941–1945: Occupation and Collaboration. Vol. 2. San Francisco: Stanford University Press. ISBN 978-0-8047-7924-1.
- Vásáry, István (2005). Cumans and Tatars: Oriental Military in the Pre-Ottoman Balkans, 1185–1365. Cambridge: Cambridge University Press. ISBN 978-1-139-44408-8.
- Veremis, Thanos; Kofos, Evangelos, eds. (1998). Kosovo: Avoiding Another Balkan War. Athens: Hellenic Foundation for European and Foreign Policy. ISBN 978-960-7061-40-9.
- Vlasto, Alexis P. (1970). The entry of the Slavs into Christendom. Cambridge University Press. ISBN 978-0-521-07459-9.
- Вуковић, Сава (1996). Српски јерарси од деветог до двадесетог века (Serbian Hierarchs from the 9th to the 20th Century). Евро, Унирекс, Каленић.
- Warrander, Gail; Knaus, Verena (2010). Kosovo (2nd ed.). Bradt Travel Guides.
