= Sava Vuković (bishop) =

Serbian Orthodox bishop

His Grace Sava (Vuković)
- Bishop
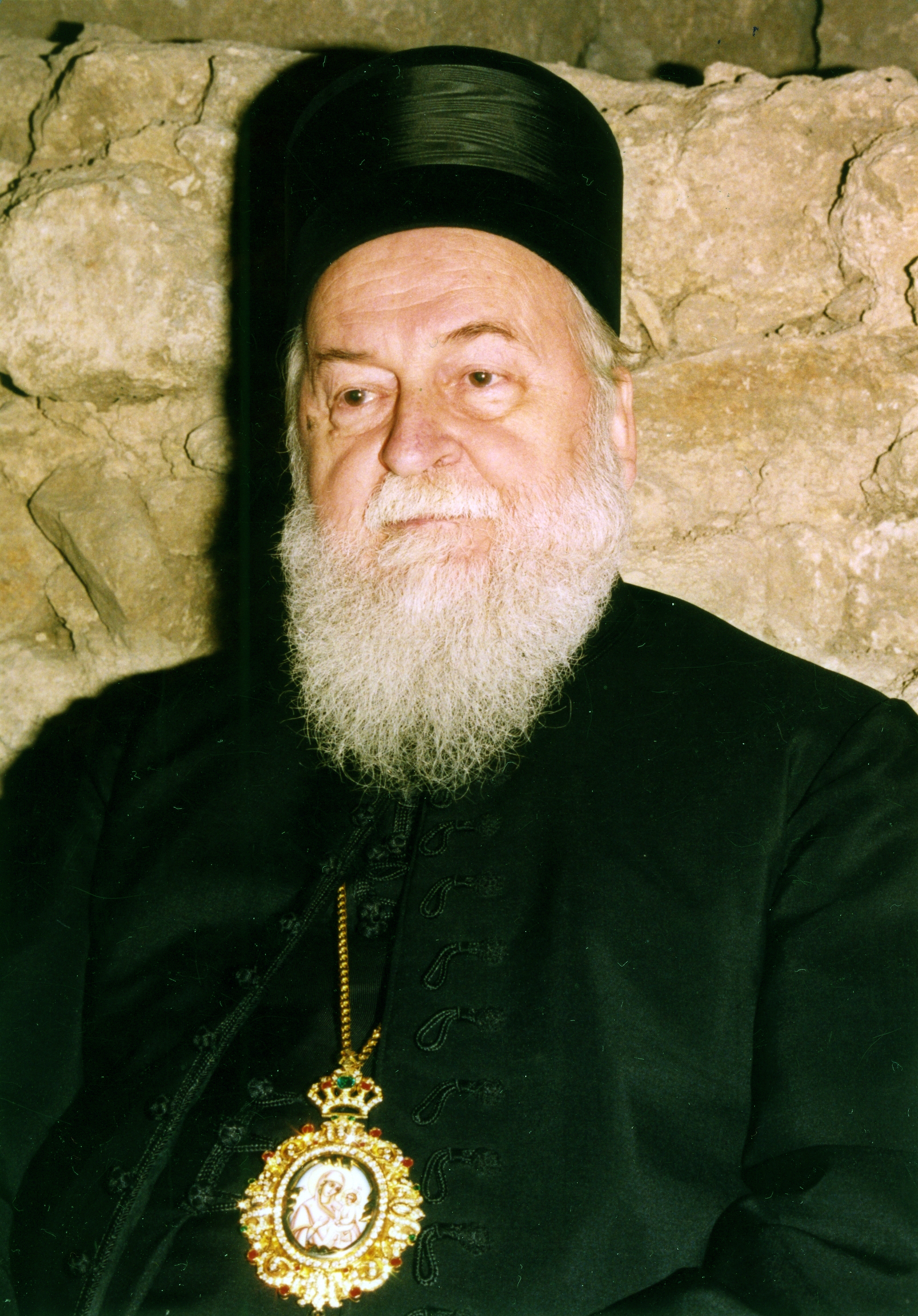
- Bishop Sava in December 1996
- Church: Serbian Orthodox Church

Orders
- Ordination: 1959
- Consecration: 1961

Personal details
- Born: Svetozar Vuković; 13 April 1930 Senta, Danube Banovina, Kingdom of Yugoslavia
- Died: 16 June 2001 (aged 71) Belgrade, Serbia, FR Yugoslavia
- Denomination: Orthodox Christian

Sava Vuković (Serbian Cyrillic: Сава Вуковић; 13 April 1930 – 16 June 2001) was a Serbian Orthodox Bishop and a corresponding member of the Serbian Academy of Sciences and Arts.

== Biography ==
He was born as Svetozar Vuković on 13 April 1930 in Senta. He finished elementary school and lower real high school in Senta, then the Theological Seminary of Saint Sava in the Rakovica Monastery in 1950, and the Faculty of Theology at the University of Belgrade in 1954. He was appointed deputy of the Theological Seminary of Saint Sava in Belgrade in 1958. In 1957 and 1958, he spent his postgraduate studies at the Old Catholic Theological Faculty at the University of Bern in Switzerland, and completed his doctoral dissertation titled The Typikon of Archbishop Nicodemus. He received his doctorate in 1961 at the Faculty of Theology at the University of Belgrade. Upon his return to Belgrade, he taught at the city's St. Sava’s Seminary.

He was ordained a monk in the Vavedenje monastery in 1959, and was ordained Vicar Bishop of Moravica in 1961 in the St. Michael's Cathedral in Belgrade by the Patriarch of the Serbian Orthodox Church German, the Bishop of Bačka Nikanor (Iličić) and the Bishop of Banat Visarion (Kostić).

He taught the Liturgy and art history at the Faculty of Theology in Belgrade from 1961 to 1967, when he was appointed Bishop of Eastern America and Canada, where he remained until 1977, when he became the Bishop of Šumadija. He represented the Serbian Orthodox Church in the commission for the preparation of the Holy and Great Council of the Orthodox Church in Geneva (1979–1991) and in the Dialogue with the Roman Catholic Church (1980–1991).

During different periods, he administered the Eparchy of Eastern American and Canada, Eparchy of Žiča, Eparchy of Banat, Eparchy of Temišvar, Eparchy of Midwestern America, Eparchy of Western America and Eparchy of Bačka. He started the construction of more than a hundred new temples in Šumadija and consecrated over fifty. He founded the Church of St. George in Viševac, the birthplace of Serbian leader Karađorđe, as a personal endowment and he renovated many monasteries throughout the Šumadija diocese. He founded several diocesan funds for financing construction activities, scholarships for priestly candidates, for the care of retired priests, the Saint John the Baptist Children's Home (Topola, Divostin), clinics in the villages of Kloka and Cvetojevac, the Human Love Charitable Fund, and the Saint John Chrysostom Theological Seminary in Grošnica. During his service in America, he founded fourteen new parishes and one monastery.

During his sixteen-year administration (1980–1996) of the Eparchy of Temišvar, he founded several Orthodox church communities and took care of the preservation and renovation of the famous Serbian monasteries Bazjaš, Bezdin, Zlatica, Kusić, Sveti Đurađ and provided theological education and scholarships for more than fifty Serbian young men from the Romanian part of Banat.

=== Works ===
He was engaged in scientific work and published works in history and liturgy in Serbian and foreign magazines and newspapers.

He wrote the books History of the Serbian Orthodox Church in America and Canada 1891–1941, Serbian Hierarchs, and Graves of Serbian Archbishops. As the Vicar Bishop of Moravica, he was the initiator of the publication of the magazine Serbian Orthodox Church – its past and present in Serbian and English, as well as the newspaper of the Serbian Patriarchate Orthodoxy, where he was editor-in-chief from the first to the seventh issue, until he left for a new duty in the United States. He was the editor-in-chief of Glasnik, the official newspaper of the Serbian Orthodox Church from June 1966 to July 1967.

He started the magazine of the Eastern American and Canadian dioceses The Path of Orthodoxy, which later became the official newspaper of the Serbian Orthodox Church in the USA and Canada. He edited the commemorative book entitled Seven and a Half Centuries of the Serbian Church, in Serbian and English, and Calendar of the Serbian Orthodox Church in America and Canada for 1971. He started Kalenić, a newspaper of the Eparchy of Šumadija. As the administrator of the dioceses of Banat (1980–1985) and Bačka (1988–1990), he renewed the former magazines of these dioceses: Banatski vesnik (1981) in Vršac and Beseda (1989) in Novi Sad. He edited Church, the Calendar of the Serbian Patriarchate in 1981 and 1982 and also during the period from 1996 to 2001.

He is the author of an article in the book The 100 most prominent Serbs. He was elected a corresponding member of the Serbian Academy of Sciences and Arts in 1997. Matica srpska elected him an associate member in 1991, and he became a permanent member in 1995.

== Awards ==
At its regular session in 2001, the Holy Assembly of Bishops of the Serbian Orthodox Church awarded Bishop Sava the Order of St. Sava (first degree) in recognition of his forty years of selfless and successful hierarchical service to the church.

By the decree of the President of the Federal Republic of Yugoslavia Vojislav Koštunica, he was posthumously awarded the White Angel Medal for exceptional personal achievement and contribution in the field of church history and humanities.

== Death ==
He died in Belgrade on 16 June 2001. He was interred in the Kragujevac Cathedral on 19 June 2001.

Serbian Orthodox Church titles
| Preceded by Stefan Lastavica | Bishop of Eastern America and Canada; 1967 – 1977 | Succeeded by Christopher Kovacevich |
| Preceded by Valerijan Stefanović | Bishop of Šumadija; 1977 – 2001 | Succeeded by Jovan Mladenović |
