= Djoko Slijepčević =

Serbian historian

Djoko M. Slijepčević
- Born: Đoko Slijepčević; 7 September 1907; Samobor, Bosnia and Herzegovina, Austria-Hungary
- Died: 16 January 1993 (aged 85); Cologne, Germany
- Occupation: Historian

Djoko M. Slijepčević (Serbian Cyrillic: Ђоко М. Слијепчевић; 7 September 1907 – 16 January 1993) was a Serbian church historian. Slijepčević was also a staunch anti-Communist, who left Yugoslavia in 1945 when the Communists seized power. He wrote numerous books about Yugoslav communist tactics in Europe, and crimes of the leadership of the Independent State of Croatia against the Serb population during World War II.

== Biography ==
He graduated from the Serbian Theological Seminary at Prizren and in 1934 from the Faculty of Theology of the University of Belgrade. In 1936, he took his doctorate degree in the historical section of the faculty with a dissertation entitled "Stevan Stratimirović, Metropolitan of Sremski Karlovci as an Ecclesiastical, National, Political and Cultural Figure." After completing his studies, he was appointed in August 1934 as a teacher at the Fifth Boys' Gymnasium in Belgrade. He spent two years at the University of Berlin specializing in ecclesiastical history and Slavic studies. In 1938 he received his tenure as a professor in the Department of the History of the Serbian Orthodox Church and Serbian Culture at the Faculty of Theology in Belgrade. During the Second World War, he taught at the University of Belgrade, supported the Government of National Salvation under the command of general Milan Nedić, and began collecting material on the Ustashi genocide of Serbs in the Independent State of Croatia. At the end of the war, he left Yugoslavia together with many freedom-fighters and intellectuals who were loyal to the ancien régime and opposed to Communism. He spent almost three years in Displaced persons camps in post-World War II Europe, first in Eboli near Salerno and then in Germany, where Dr. Adolf Küry the Bishop of Bern intervened and helped to resettle many Serbian refugees, including Slijepčević, who then settled in Bern in 1948 and enrolled in the Institute of Old Catholic Theology (Institut für Christkatholische Theologie) within the University of Bern for 12 semesters until 1954. It was there that he began collecting archival material for his chef d'oeuvre - The History of the Serbian Orthodox Church. Throughout his life outside his captive homeland, he kept in contact with many Serbian intellectuals, including Lazo M. Kostić and Dimitrije Najdanović.

After fully mastering the German language in 1954, he moved from Bern, Switzerland to Munich, Germany where he joined the staff of the "Institute for Southeast European Studies" as a reference officer for Albania and Bulgaria. He died in Cologne in 1993 and is buried in the Serbian Cemetery in Osnabrück.

== Works ==
- Pajsije arhiepiskop pećki i patrijarh srpski kao jerarh i književni radnik, 1933.
- Ukidanje Pećke patrijaršije 1766, 1934.
- Humsko-hercegovačka eparhija i episkopat od 1219 do kraja 19. veka, 1940.
- Pitanje pravoslavne crkve u Makedoniji, Munich, 1959.
- Pitanje makedonske crkve u Jugoslaviji or "The Macedonian Church Question in Yugoslavia," Munich, 1958.
- Istorija srpske pravoslavne crkve or "History of the Serbian Orthodox Church", volumes 1–3, Munich-Keln, Press: Drukerei, 1966.
- Ogrešenja vladike Dionisija or "The Transgressions of Bishop Dionsije", Iskra, 1963.
- Srpsko-arbanaški odnosi kroz vekove sa posebnim osvrtom na novije vreme, Munich, 1974."Serbo-Albanian Relations Through the Ages with Special Reference to Recent Times", Munich, 1974
- "The Question of Bosnia and Hercegovina in 19th century," Kelln, 1981.
- "Serbo-Albanian Relations Through the Ages with Special Reference to Recent Times" (2 ed.), 1983, Himmelstyr: Iskra.
- Jugoslavija uoči i za vreme Drugog svetskog rata, Munich, 1978.
- Mihailo arhiepiskop beogradski i mitropolit Srbije, Munich, 1983.
- Isihazam kod južnih Slovena (neobjavljen rukopis na nemačkom jeziku). "Isihazam in the Southern Slavs" (unpublished manuscript in German).
- Konfesionalne suprotnosti na Balkanu u 19. veku (neobjavljen rukopis na nemačkom jeziku)."Confessional Contradictions in the Balkans in the 19th Century" (unpublished manuscript in German).
- Hilandarsko Pitanje U XIX i Pocetkim XX Veka, Munich, 1978.
- Od pokrštavanja Srba do kraja XVIII veka, Ostrog, 1978.

== See also ==
- Viktor Novak
- Edmond Paris
- Avro Manhattan
- Dimitrije Najdanović
- Lazo M. Kostić
- Branko Bokun
