= Serbian Patriarch =

Head of the Serbian Orthodox Church

- Archbishopric

Eastern Orthodox
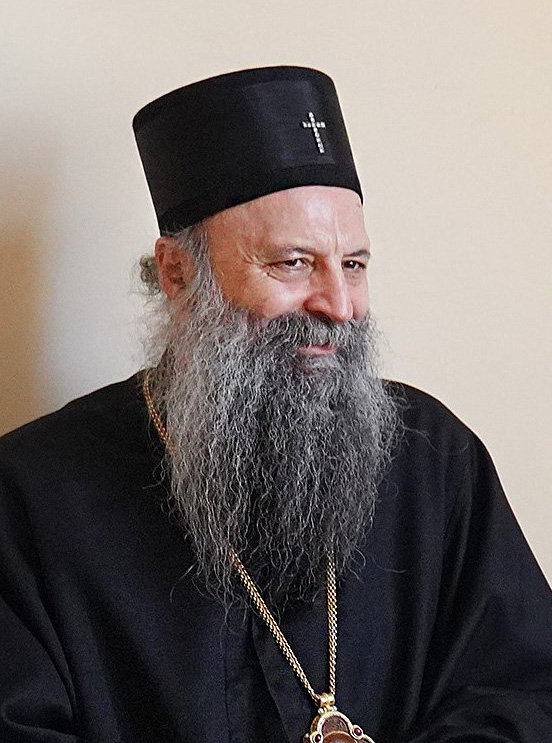

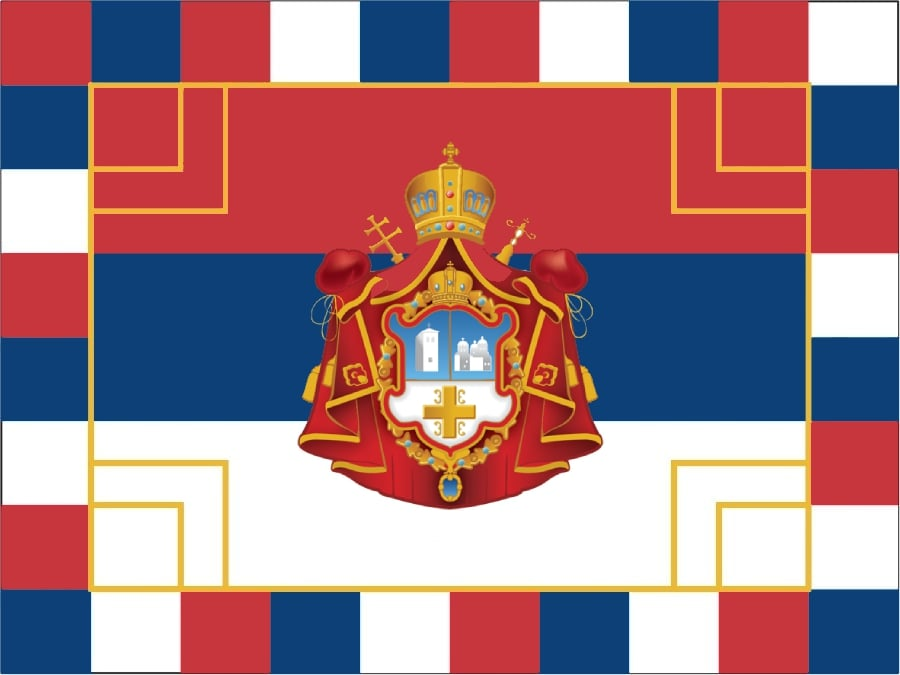
- Flag of the Serbian Patriarch
- Incumbent; Porfirije since 19 February 2021
- Style: His Holiness

Location
- Residence: Patriarchal Residence, Belgrade

Information
- First holder: Joanikije II
- Established: 1346; 1557 (re-established); 1920 (re-established)

The Serbian Patriarch (Serbian: Патријарх српски, Patrijarh srpski) is the patriarch of the Serbian Orthodox Church and exercises ecclesiastical authority over Eastern Orthodox Christians in Serbia, Bosnia and Herzegovina, Montenegro, Kosovo, Croatia, and Slovenia. The current patriarch is Porfirije, who acceded to the position in 2021.

== History ==
The autocephalous Serbian Archbishopric was established in 1219 by Sava under the authority of the Patriarch of Constantinople. In 1346, when Stefan Dušan proclaimed himself Emperor of the Serbs, he also elevated the archbishop’s see of Peć to the rank of a patriarchate, thereby establishing the position of the Serbian Patriarch. This elevation was recognized by the Ecumenical Patriarchate of Constantinople in 1375.

Following the Ottoman conquest of Serbia in 1459, the Serbian Patriarch gradually lost his influence. At times, the church was compelled by the Ottoman authorities to appoint ethnic Greek hierarchs to the patriarchal position. From 1766 to 1920, the patriarchate was abolished, and all ecclesiastical jurisdiction was transferred to the Ecumenical Patriarch of Constantinople. Nevertheless, a metropolitan see continued to exist in Belgrade after 1766; it gained autonomy in 1831 and autocephaly in 1879. The Patriarchate of Karlovci, which existed from 1848 to 1920, claimed succession from the Serbian Patriarchate.

In 1920, the Eastern Orthodox jurisdictions within the newly established Kingdom of Yugoslavia (the Metropolitanate of Belgrade, the Patriarchate of Karlovci, and the Metropolitanate of Montenegro) were unified into the Serbian Orthodox Church, with the patriarchate restored and the patriarchal see transferred to Belgrade.

== Title and style ==
Different variations of the title of the patriarch have been used throughout history. First Serbian Archbishop Sava (s. 1219–33) was styled "Archbishop of Serb Lands" and "Archbishop of Serb Lands and the Littoral" in the Vranjina charter, while Domentijan (fl. 1253) used the style "Archbishop of all the Serbian and coastal lands" when speaking of Sava. The fresco of Sava at Mileševa titles him "the first Archbishop of All Serb and Diocletian Lands". Archbishop Sava III (s. 1309–16) was styled "Archbishop of All Serb and Littoral Lands". First Serbian Patriarch, Joanikije II, was styled "Archbishop of Peć and Patriarch of all Serb Lands and the Littoral". First patriarch of the restored Patriarchate of Peć, Makarije I, was styled "Archbishop of Peć and Patriarch of Serbs and Bulgarians". Currently, the title of the head of the Serbian Orthodox Church is "Archbishop of Peć, Metropolitan of Belgrade and Karlovci, and Serbian Patriarch" (Serbian: Aрхиепископ пећки, митрополит београдско-карловачки и патријарх српски, Arhiepiskop pećki, mitropolit beogradsko-karlovački i patrijarh srpski). The current version of the title was first used in 1920 when the Serbian Orthodox Church was reunified and the patriarchate was reestablished.

The Patriarch is accorded the style "His Holiness".

== Election and tenure ==
The Patriarch of the Serbian Orthodox Church is elected from among active bishops who have governed their dioceses for at least five years. The election is conducted by the Electoral Council which is presided by the most senior bishop (by episcopal consecration) and includes bishops, representatives of theological schools and seminaries, abbots of major monasteries, as well as members of central church administrative bodies. The Electoral Council must convene within three months after the Patriarchal See becomes vacant and is summoned by the Council of Bishops. The election is conducted by secret ballot and from among three candidates proposed by the Council of Bishops. A candidate receiving an absolute majority of votes is elected Patriarch. If no candidate secures a majority, a second round is held between the two leading candidates, with ties resolved according to seniority or ultimately by drawing lots. After the election, the president of the Electoral Council proclaims the name of the new Patriarch.

The enthronement ceremony of the newly elected Patriarch is traditionally held at the Patriarchate of Peć Monastery, symbolizing continuity with the throne of Saint Sava.

The tenure of the Patriarch is for life.

== Duties ==
As the ordinary of the Archdiocese of Belgrade and Karlovci, his canonical remit extends only to Belgrade; however, as the patriarch, he exercises the following prerogatives:

- represents the Serbian Orthodox Church before other autocephalous churches;
- represents the Serbian Orthodox Church at ecclesiastical and state ceremonies;
- preserves the unity of the hierarchy of the Serbian Orthodox Church;
- consecrates diocesan and vicar bishops;
- chairs the Holy Synod.

== Garments and insignia ==
Patriarch bears, as distinctive ecclesiastical insignia, the white kalimavkion (stiff cylindrical head covering which is flat at the top) with a cross, and the panagia. The panagia, worn on chest, is a small icon, usually circular in shape, depicting the Mother of God holding the Christ Child on one side, and Jesus Christ or the Holy Trinity in the form of the three angels.

The standard of the Serbian Patriarch is a Serbian tricolour consisting of three equal horizontal bands, red on the top, blue in the middle, and white on the bottom, bordered with alternating red, blue, and white squares, and with the coat of arms of the Serbian Orthodox Church at its center.

== Office and residence ==
The Palace of the Patriarchate in Belgrade, besides serving as the administrative seat of the Serbian Orthodox Church, is also the official patriarchal office. The entire first floor is reserved for the Patriarch and comprises the Patriarch’s office, library, reception hall, chapel, and private apartment.

The Patriarchal Residence is also in Belgrade, in Dedinje neighborhood, at Užička 46. It was built in the 1930s and bought by the Church in 1939. It served as the residence of patriarchs Gavrilo V, Vikentije II, and German. Patriarchs Pavle and Irinej resided at the patriarchal apartment of the Palace of the Patriarchate. The Patriarchal Residence was renovated in 2012 and again 2024, and is currently used by Patriarch Porfirije.

== See also ==
- List of heads of the Serbian Orthodox Church
- List of current Christian leaders
- List of current popes and patriarchs
