= Coronation of the Serbian monarch =

Anointment and coronation of Peter I of Serbia in 1904.
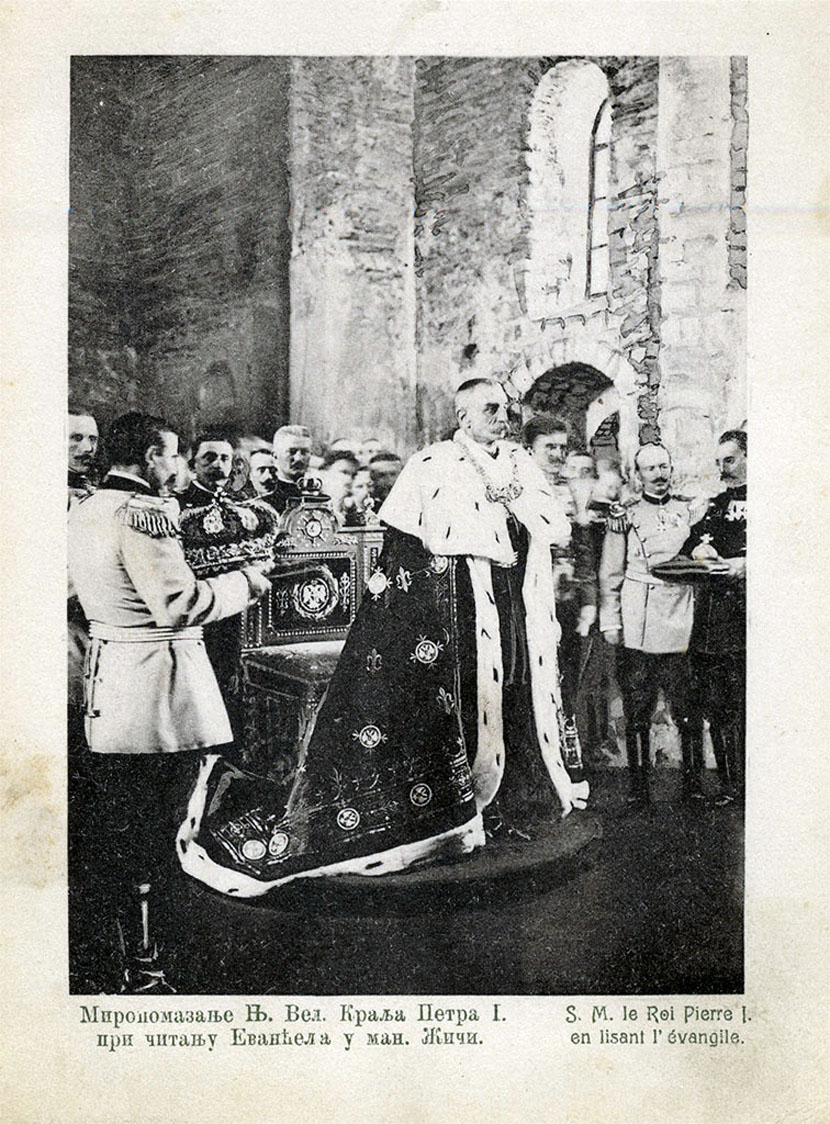
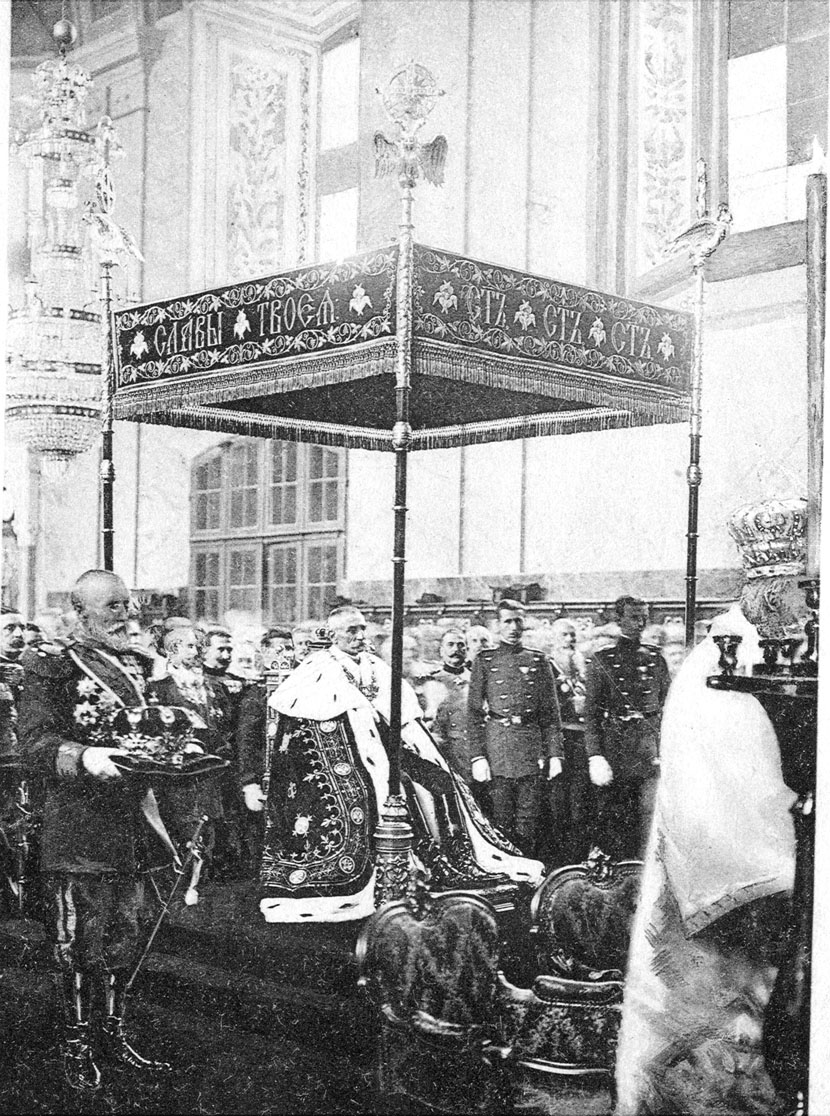

The accession of the Serbian monarch was legitimised by a coronation ceremony, which was carried out by church officials.

== Ceremony ==
=== Middle Ages ===
The ritual of crowning a new ruler (royal enthronement) is attested in the 12th century. The coronation of Serbian monarchs took place in the most prominent of churches in the country. The coronation of the Grand Princes of Serbia was likely held at the church in Ras. The successors of Stefan Nemanja adopted Byzantine ideas on self-rule and acts on the ruler's anointment and coronation. The church official (archbishop, patriarch) anointed and crowned the ruler in the same ceremony. Through the archiereus, with the act of crowning, God's grace transits to the ruler.

== History ==
=== Middle Ages ===
The ritual of crowning a new ruler is attested in the 12th century. The coronation of Serbian monarchs took place in the most prominent of churches in the country. Stefan (r. 1196–1228), the son of Grand Prince Stefan Nemanja, was crowned with a crown sent by Pope Honorius III in 1217. According to Fine Jr., he was crowned by a papal legate. It is unknown where the coronation took place. J. Kalić believes that it was Peter's Church, Ras. It has been assumed that Stefan was crowned a second time by Archbishop Sava, his brother. In the second charter to the Žiča monastery dated to ca. 1224, King Stefan ordered for all future kings to be crowned at that monastery. His contemporaries and successors called him "the First-Crowned King".

=== Modern ===
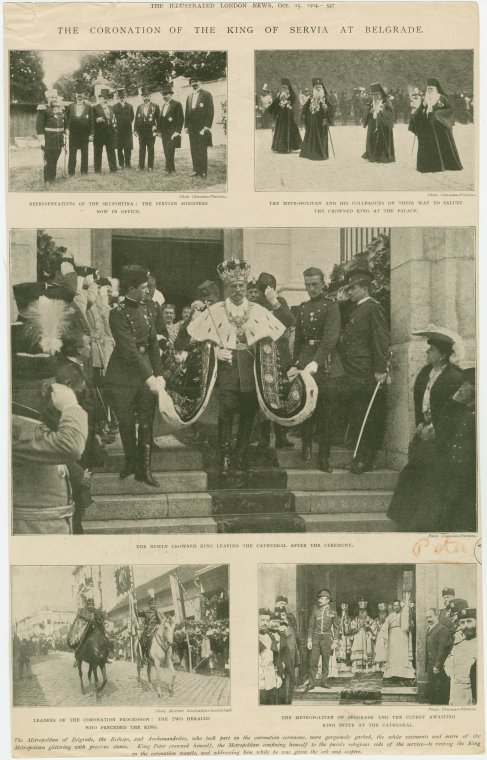
"The Coronation of the King of Serbia at Belgrade", The Illustrated London News (15 October 1904).

Serbia's last and only modern coronation was in 1904, when King Peter I was crowned in an Eastern Orthodox Christian ceremony at the Cathedral of the Host of Holy Archangels in Belgrade. Serbia became a part of the state of Yugoslavia after World War I, but Peter did not hold a second coronation and neither of his two successors, the Yugoslav monarchs Alexander and Peter II, were crowned. This was due to the religious diversity of the new state.

== Regalia ==
=== Middle Ages ===
Stefan's crown was called "the holy wreath" (sveti venac) by Domentijan. Later, it was called "the god-gifted wreath of the Serbian kingdom" (bogodarovani venac kraljevstva srpskog).

=== Modern ===
Modern Serbian regalia were created in Paris by the famous Falise brothers jewellers in 1904 for coronation of king Peter I Karađorđević, and consisted of a royal crown, orb, sceptre, mantle, and mantle buckle. The crown, known as the "Karađorđević Crown", was partially made out of a cannon that Karađorđe had used during the First Serbian Uprising, and was adorned with details such as the Serbian eagle and Serbian cross. The crown, scepter, and orb were decorated with gemstones extracted in Serbia and enameled in the Serbian national colours (red, blue, and white). The mantle was made out of purple velvet, embroidered with gold and lined with ermine fur.

== Symbolism ==
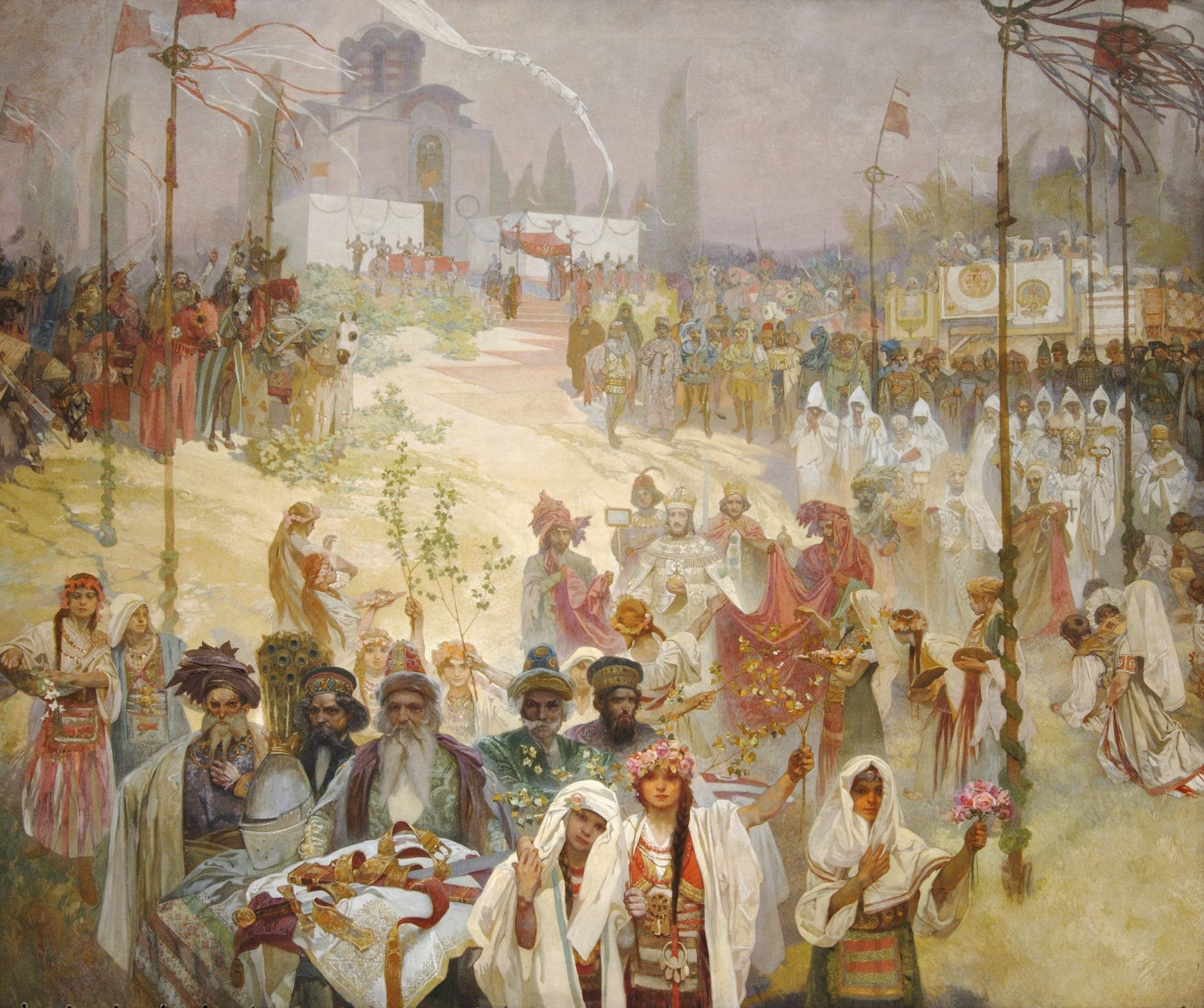
The Coronation of the Serbian Tsar Stefan Dušan as East Roman Emperor, part of the Slav Epic series by Alfons Mucha, 1926.

The sacredness of the Serbian throne is frequently stressed in medieval sources. Apart from the throne, the crown was one of the most important royal insignia in the Middle Ages.

== Coronations ==
=== Middle Ages ===
- Stefan (r. 1217–28), uncertain.
- Stefan Radoslav (r. 1228–33), crowned at Žiča by Archbishop Sava, his uncle.
- Stefan Vladislav (r. 1234–43), crowned at Žiča by Archbishop Arsenije.
- Stefan Uroš I (r. 1243–76), crowned at Žiča by Archbishop Arsenije.
- Stefan Dragutin (r. 1276–82), crowned at Žiča.
- Stefan Milutin (r. 1282–1321), crowned at Žiča by Archbishop Jevstatije I after the Deževa Assembly in early 1282.
- Stefan Konstantin (r. 1321–22).
- Stefan Dečanski (r. 1322–31), crowned by Archbishop Nikodim I on 6 January 1322.
- Stefan Dušan (r. 1331–55), crowned emperor at Skopje by Patriarch Joanikije II on 16 April 1346.
- Stefan Uroš V (r. 1355–71).

=== Modern ===
- Peter I Karađorđević (1903–1921), crowned at St. Michael's Cathedral in Belgrade on 21 September 1904

== See also ==
- List of Serbian monarchs
- Serbian royal titles
- Regalia of Serbia

== Sources ==
- Ćirković, Sima; Mihaljčić, Rade (1999). Лексикон српског средњег века. Knowledge. ISBN 9788683233014.
- Fine, John Van Antwerp Jr. (1994). The Late Medieval Balkans: A Critical Survey from the Late Twelfth Century to the Ottoman Conquest. Ann Arbor: University of Michigan Press. ISBN 978-0-472-08260-5.
- Kalić, Jovanka (1998). "Претече Жиче: Крунидбена места српских владара". Историјски часопис. XLIV. Istorijski institut: 77–87.
- Marjanović-Dušanić, Smilja; Ćirković, Sima M. (1994). Vladarske insignije i državna simbolika u Srbiji od XIII do XV veka. Srpska akademija nauka i umetnosti. ISBN 9788670251830.
- Veselinović, Andrija; Ljušić, Radoš (2008). Srpske dinastije. Službeni glasnik. ISBN 978-86-7549-921-3.
