= Danilo of Montenegro =

Danilo of Montenegro may refer to:

- Danilo I, Metropolitan of Montenegro, in office (1697-1735)
- Danilo II, Metropolitan of Montenegro, in office (1961-1990)
- Danilo I, Prince of Montenegro, ruling prince (1826–1860)
- Danilo, Crown Prince of Montenegro (b. 1871 - d. 1939)

== See also ==
- Danilo I (disambiguation)
- Danilo II (disambiguation)
