= Danilo I =

Danilo I may refer to:

- Danilo I, Serbian Archbishop
- Danilo I, Metropolitan of Cetinje
- Danilo I, Prince of Montenegro

== See also ==
- Order of Prince Danilo I
- Crown Prince Danilo I of Montenegro
- Danilo Petrović-Njegoš (disambiguation)
- Danilo II (disambiguation)
- Danilo III (disambiguation)
