= Joanikije I =

Serbian Archbishop

- Serbian Archbishop
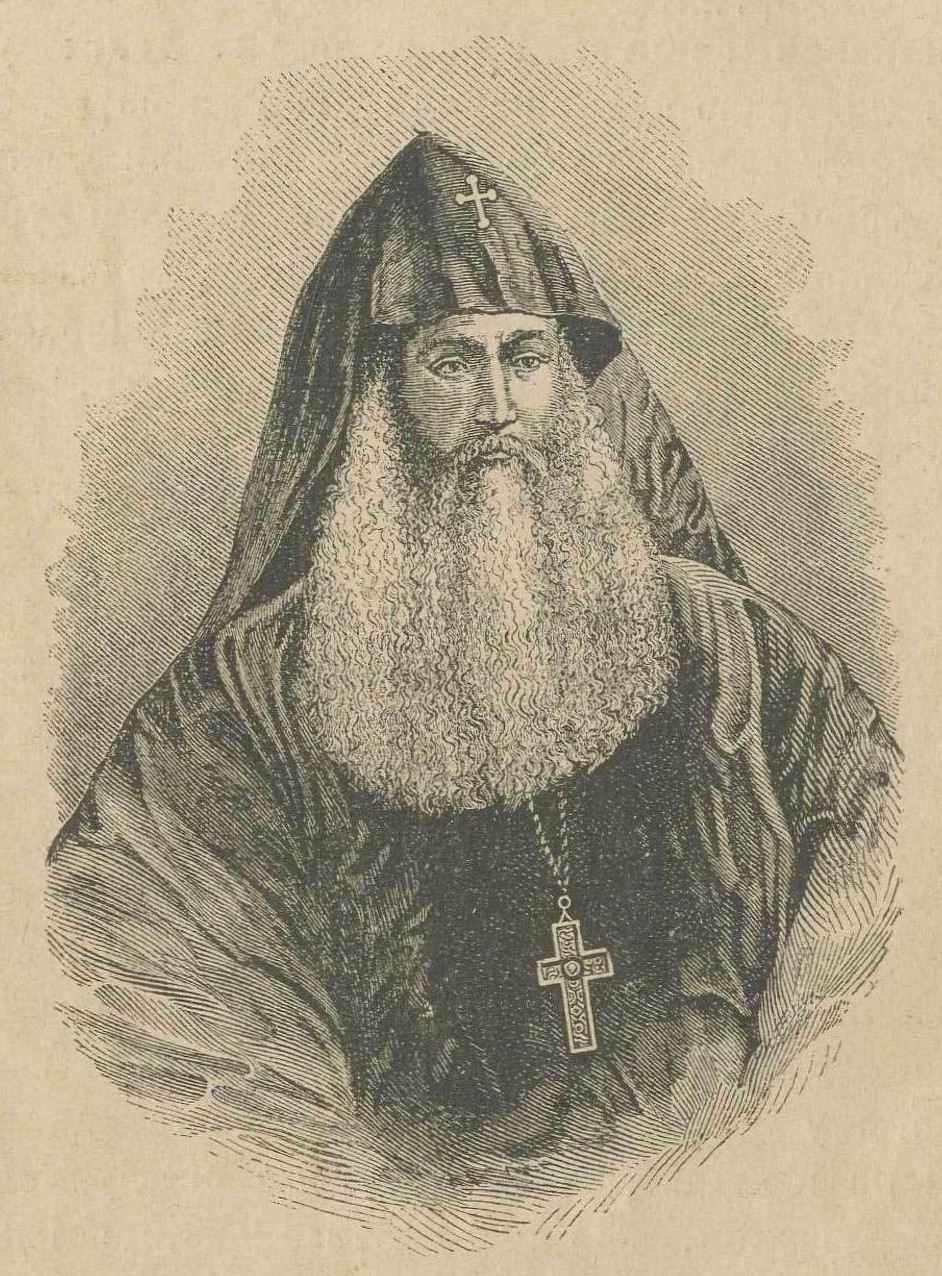
- Church: Serbian Orthodox Church
- See: Metropolitanate of Peć
- Installed: 1272
- Term ended: 1276
- Predecessor: Danilo I
- Successor: Jevstatije I

Personal details
- Died: 1279
- Buried: Sopoćani Monastery
- Denomination: Eastern Orthodoxy

Joanikije I (Serbian: Јоаникије I) was the fifth Serbian Archbishop, serving from 1272 to 1276. He succeeded Danilo I and was succeeded by Jevstatije I.

He was a disciple of Archbishop Sava II when Sava II was still a bishop. Together they went to the Holy Land and the Holy Mountain (Mount Athos), whence they returned to Serbia. Joanikije then departed again for Mount Athos, to the Hilandar monastery for his education. Later, he became an oeconomus (ikonom) of Hilandar around 1255/56, then became the hegumen in 1257, an office he held until 1262–63. The Hilandar hegumens and brotherhood had a great reputation in 13th-century Serbia, producing several Serbian archbishops. He then returned to Serbia, becoming the hegumen of the Studenica monastery.

Serbian archbishop Danilo I served only for a year; later Archbishop and chronicler Danilo II (s. 1324–1337) wrote "Archbishop Danilo succeeded on the holy seat, but due to some cause was removed". The cause of his removal is unknown, it may have been due to Danilo having been unsupportive of King Stefan Uroš I (and supportive of Stefan Dragutin); this theory is strengthened by the fact that Danilo's successor Joanikije was a fanatic supporter of Uroš I. It is unlikely that Danilo II did not know the cause of Danilo I's removal. Danilo II spoke of the appointment of Joanikije: "And because they expected much, they did not find anyone else worthy of such a position, apart from this blessed Joanikije, who at that time was the hegumen of the place of the Virgin Most Holy, the place called Studenica".

During his time as the head of the Serbian Church, the Byzantine Emperor Michael VIII Palaiologos, who restored the Byzantine Empire in 1261, made a tenuous union with the Catholic Church at the Second Council of Lyon in 1274. Two years later, in 1276, King Stefan Uroš I was overthrown by his son Stefan Dragutin, to whom he had not given half his kingdom as he had promised. Uroš withdrew with Joanikije and took monastic vows as "Simon", then died the next year, in 1277. Joanikije died in 1279 in Hum. Queen Helena of Anjou, Uroš's widow, had both the king's and archbishop's relics buried in Sopoćani monastery.

It is unclear whether it is Joanikije I depicted in the fresco composition of archbishops at Morača.

== See also ==
- List of heads of the Serbian Orthodox Church

Religious titles
Preceded by Danilo I	Serbian Archbishop; 1272–1276	Succeeded by Jevstatije I

== Sources ==
- Miodrag Al Purković; Miodrag M. Purković (1976). Srpski patrijarsi Srednjega veka. Srpska pravoslavna eparhija zapadnoevropska.
- Сима Ћирковић; Раде Михальчић (1999). Лексикон српског средњег века. Knowledge. ISBN 9788683233014.
