= Joanikije II =

First Serbian Patriarch

Saint Joanikije II
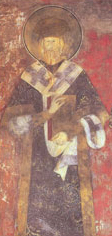
- Fresco depicting Joanikije II in the Patriarchate of Peć Monastery

Archbishop of All Serbian and Maritime Lands
- Venerated in: Eastern Orthodox Church
- Church: Serbian Patriarchate of Peć
- See: Patriarchate of Peć Monastery
- Installed: January 3, 1338
- Term ended: September 3, 1354
- Predecessor: Danilo II
- Successor: Sava IV
- Other post: logotet

Orders
- Rank: Metropolitan, Archbishop, Patriarch

Personal details
- Died: September 3, 1354
- Buried: Patriarchate of Peć Monastery
- Denomination: Eastern Orthodoxy
- Residence: Prizren, Peć
- Education: Hilandar

Sainthood
- Feast day: ? [O.S. September 3]
- Canonized: by Serbian Orthodox Church

Joanikije II (Serbian Cyrillic: Јоаникије II; fl. 1337– d. 1354) was the Serbian Archbishop (1338–1346) and first Patriarch of the Serbian Patriarchate of Peć (1346–1354). He was elected Serbian Archbishop on January 3, 1338. Prior to his election, he served as a logotet, royal chancellor, to the Kingdom of Serbia.

He was elevated to Patriarch on Palm Sunday, April 6, 1346, done in order for Joanikije to crown King Stefan Uroš IV Dušan as Emperor on Easter of 1346.

Joanikije continued a tradition of church building, and built, among others, two churches in the Holy Land: the Church of St. Elias on Mount Carmel and the Church of St. Nicholas on Mount Tabor. He died on September 3, 1354, which is his feast day. He was buried in the Patriarchal Monastery of Peć.

== Life ==
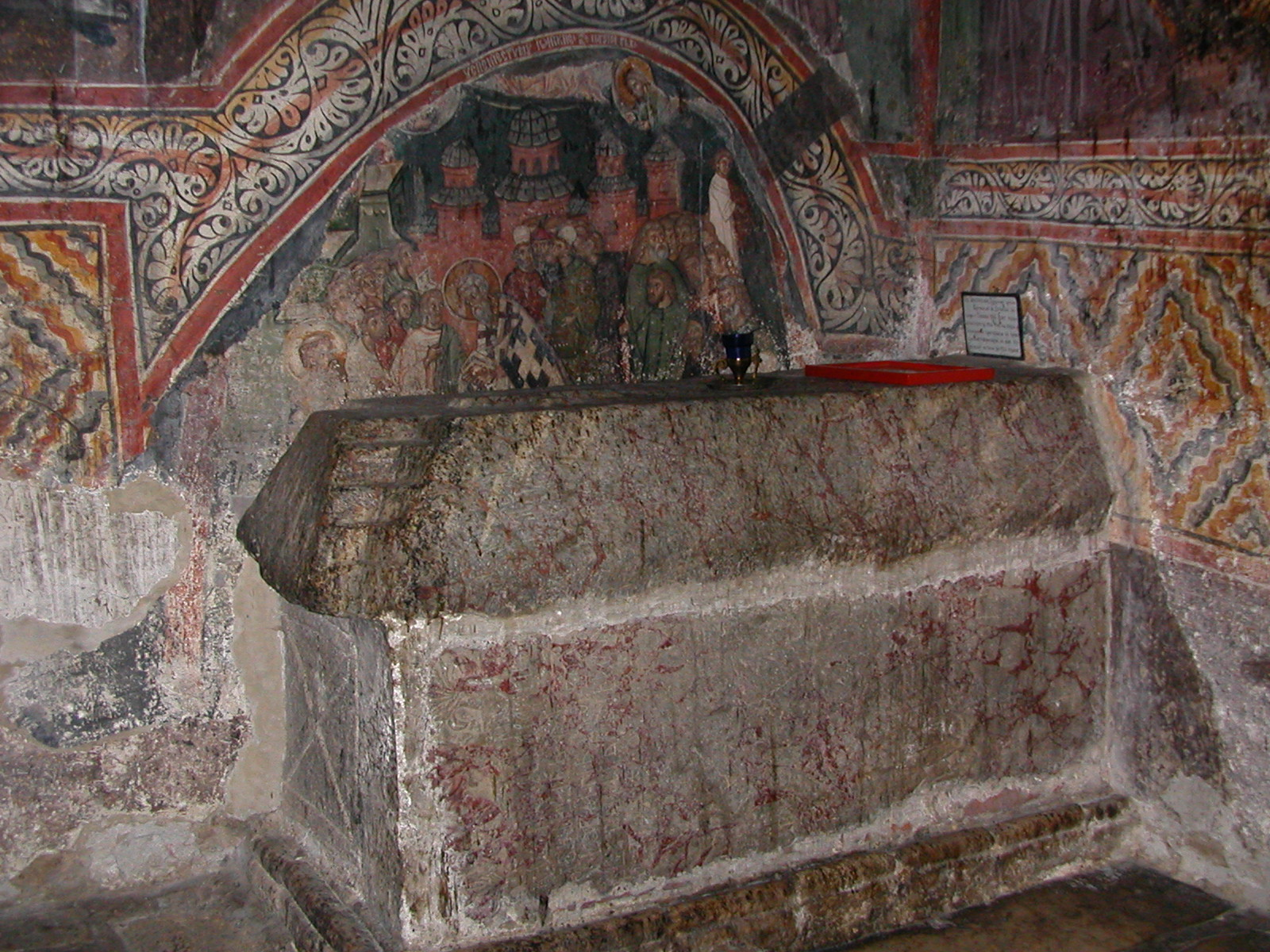
Tomb of Joanikije II at the Patriarchate of Peć Monastery

Joanikije was born in the vicinity of Prizren, an important town in the Kingdom of Serbia. His family was Christian.

Joanikije served as a logotet, royal chancellor, to the Serbian King Stefan Uroš IV Dušan (r. 1331–1346; afterwards as Emperor until 1355).

Archbishop Danilo II died on December 19, 1337. Joanikije was elected Serbian Archbishop on January 3, 1338. He continued the Christian work of his predecessors, and had the Monastery of Peć, which was the seat of the Archbishop built by Nikodim and Danilo I, further worked on, adding icons and frescoes and other things.

King Dušan had expanded his territory into the deep Greek (Byzantine) south in the 1340s. In 1346, the king convened a regional assembly of church leaders, which declared the independence of the Serbian Church and elevated it to a Patriarchate. Joanikije was designated Patriarch on Palm Sunday, April 6, 1346, done in order for Joanikije to crown King Stefan Uroš IV Dušan as Emperor on Easter of 1346 with the approval of the Patriarch of Trnovo, Archbishop of Ohrid, and community of Mount Athos.

Joanikije II continued a tradition of church building, and built, among others, two churches in the Holy Land: the Church of St. Elias on Mount Carmel and the Church of St. Nicholas on Mount Tabor.

Joanikije II died on September 3, 1354. This has become his feast day. He was buried in the Patriarchal Monastery of Peć.

== See also ==
- List of saints of the Serbian Orthodox Church
- List of heads of the Serbian Orthodox Church

Eastern Orthodox Church titles
| Preceded by Danilo II | Serbian Archbishop; January 3, 1338 – April 6, 1346 | Succeeded by None |
| Preceded by None | Serbian Patriarch; April 6, 1346 – September 3, 1354 | Succeeded by Sava IV |

== Annotations ==
- Name: His name was Joanikije (Greek: Joanikios, Latin: Joanicius). His family surname is unknown.

== Sources ==
This article incorporates text from Joanicius II of Peć at OrthodoxWiki which is licensed under the CC-BY-SA and GFDL.

- Л. Мирковић. Архиепископ Данило (и његови настављачи): Животи краљева и архиепископа Српских. СКЗ.
