= Danilo III =

Danilo III may refer to:

- Danilo III, Serbian Patriarch
- Danilo III of Montenegro

== See also ==
- Danilo I (disambiguation)
- Danilo II (disambiguation)
