= Sava IV =

Serbian Patriarch

Sava IV (Serbian Cyrillic: Сава IV) was the Patriarch of the Serbian Patriarchate of Peć in the period of 1354–1375. He became the second patriarch during the reign of Serbian emperor Stefan Dušan (r. 1331–55), succeeding Patriarch Joanikije II (s. 1346–1354, Serbian Archbishop since 1338). He continued his office into the reign of Stefan Uroš V (r. 1355–71).

The hegumen of Hilandar, he succeeded as the Serbian Patriarch after the death of Joanikije II (3 September 1354), being appointed after the assembly in Serres convoked by Emperor Dušan on 29 November 1354. During his office, the Serbian Church worked to reconcile with the Patriarchate of Constantinople, relations having deteriorated following Serbian expansion. Of six chrysobulls of emperors Dušan and Uroš V, Sava IV is only called the Patriarch of Greeks in one, that to Arhiljevica dated 14 August 1354. How Sava IV held towards the started reconcilement process is unknown. He died on 29 April 1375, and was buried in the Church of St. Demetrius in Peć. The reconciliation came the same year after his death, during the reign of Prince Lazar of Serbia, owing to diplomacy in which Isaija the Monk was instrumental. In the hagiography of Sava IV, Stefan Dušan's coronation is condemned.

== See also ==
- List of saints of the Serbian Orthodox Church
- List of heads of the Serbian Orthodox Church

| Preceded by Joanikije II | Serbian Patriarch; 29 November 1354 – 29 April 1375 | Succeeded by Jefrem |

== Sources ==
- Purković, Miodrag (1976). Srpski patrijarsi Srednjega veka. Srpska pravoslavna eparhija zapadnoevropska.
- Sava of Šumadija (1996). Srpski jerarsi: od devetog do dvadesetog veka. Evro. pp. 427–428.
- Slijepčević, Đoko M. (1962). Istorija Srpske pravoslavne crkve. Vol. 1. pp. 175–179, 190.
