= Danilo Petrović-Njegoš =

Danilo Petrović-Njegoš may refer to:

- Danilo I, Metropolitan of Cetinje (1670–1735), Metropolitan of Cetinje
- Danilo I, Prince of Montenegro (1826–1860), ruling Prince of Montenegro
- Danilo, Crown Prince of Montenegro (1871–1939), Crown Prince of Montenegro

== See also ==
- Danilo Petrović (disambiguation)
