= Jevstatije I =

Serbian archbishop and saint

Saint Jevstatije I
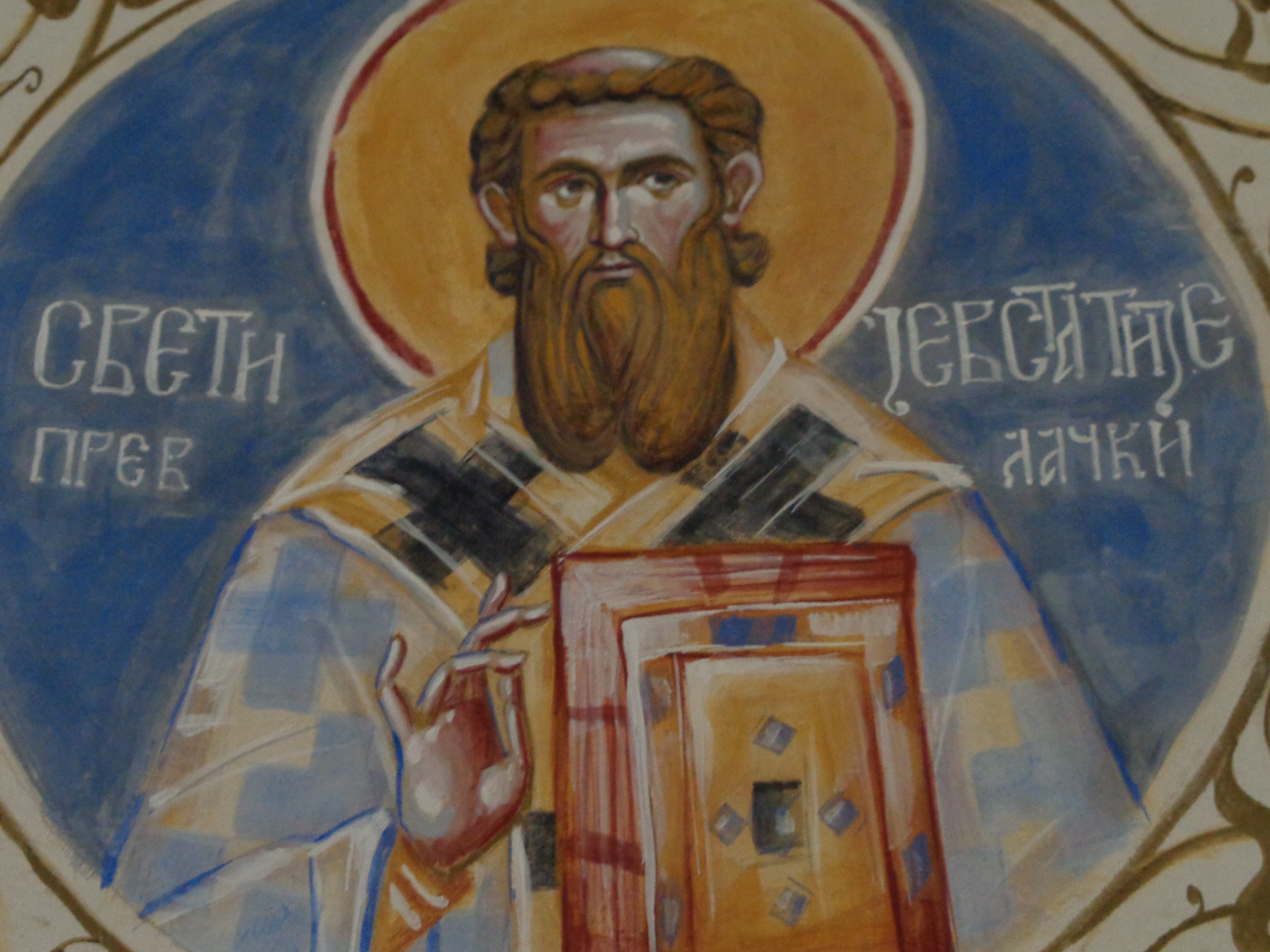
- Fresco depicting Jevstatije I in the Church of Saint Jovan Vladimir, Bar

Serbian Archbishop
- Church: Serbian Orthodox Church
- See: Metropolitanate of Peć
- Installed: 1279
- Term ended: 1286
- Predecessor: Joanikije I
- Successor: Jakov I

Personal details
- Born: Budimlje parish
- Died: January 4, 1286
- Buried: Žiča (1186–1190), Peć
- Denomination: Eastern Orthodoxy

Sainthood
- Feast day: January 4 (January 17, Gregorian)
- Canonized: by Serbian Orthodox Church
- Shrines: Patriarchate of Peć Monastery

Jevstatije I (Serbian: Јевстатије I) was the sixth Serbian Archbishop, holding the office from 1279 to 1286. He was born in the Budimlje parish, near Berane in Zeta. He took his monastics vows in Zeta, then left for the Hilandar monastery to study and meditate and, where he later became the hegumen (abbot), succeeding Joanikije, holding the office 1162–65. He left the monastery and became the fourth Bishop of Zeta, and later the Serbian Archbishop in 1279, succeeding Joanikije I. He died on 4 January 1286. His relics were buried in the Monastery of Peć in 1289-1290, after being transferred from the ruined Žiča monastery. The Serbian Orthodox Church commemorates him on 4 January according to the Julian calendar, or 17 January according to the Gregorian calendar.

During his lifetime, Archbishop Jevstatije was considered a true authority of the Serbian Orthodox Church - he went through all the main stages of monastic life. He gained rich experience of asceticism, but also of life in the monastic community. He traveled far and wide to sacred places, was the head of the most important Serbian monastery, Hilandar, then the head of the monastery of "Saint Archangel Michael" at Prevlaka, and then the bishop of an important Serbian diocese in the western Serbian region. During his lifetime, he made extraordinary efforts to preserve Orthodoxy in the Archbishopric, especially taking care of the works in the church of the "Ascension of Our Lord" in Žiča, where Jevstatije's body was laid down after he died. The time of the final formation of Jevstatije’s cult in the form of the hymnographic works devoted to him was the time of significant changes in the spiritual culture of the Serbian people. Both the prose and poetic works dedicated to the worship of Saint Archbishop Jevstatije were created by the same author, Archbishop Danilo II of Peć. This gifted monk, а patient church chief and а wise counselor of the Serbian rulers, skillfully shaped the image of Saint Archbishop Jevstatije, fulfilling the high spiritual and liturgical requirements of the time. With his hagiographic compositions collected in the famous Monograph, Danilo made decisive steps in shaping the cults of certain Serbian rulers, and then he added to the "Serbian Saints Council" the cults of the Church's "generals" Arsenije, Jevstatije and Joanikije (for the former two he composed both the biography and the service). By both his hagiographic and hymnographic literary work, he followed the main tendencies of his time and literally and liturgically shaped one of the central ideas in presenting the holy archipriests as worthy heirs to the throne of Saint Sava.

== See also ==
- List of saints of the Serbian Orthodox Church
- List of heads of the Serbian Orthodox Church

Religious titles
Preceded by Joanikije I	Serbian Archbishop; 1279–1286	Succeeded by Jakov I

== Sources ==
- ЦРКВЕНЕ СТУДИЈЕ 16-2 Центар за Црквене студије Ниш (Niš), 2019

== Sources ==
- Bataković, Dušan T., ed. (2005). Histoire du peuple serbe. Lausanne: L’Age d’Homme. ISBN 9782825119587.
