= Sava II =

Serbian archbishop and saint

Saint Sava II
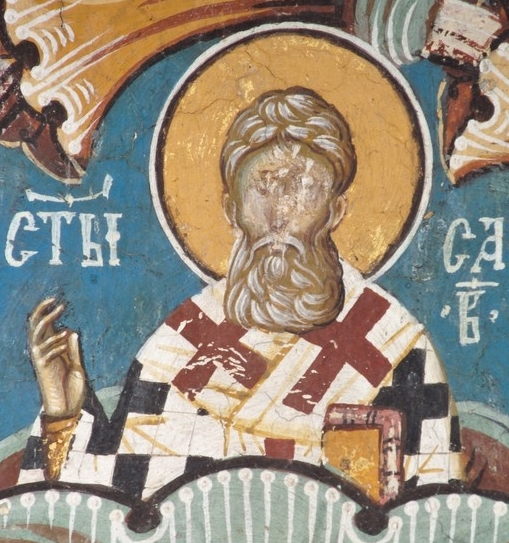
- Fresco depicting Sava II in the Visoki Dečani Monastery

Serbian Archbishop
- Church: Serbian Orthodox Church
- Installed: 1263
- Term ended: 1271
- Predecessor: Arsenije I
- Successor: Danilo I

Personal details
- Born: Predislav; 1201 Ras
- Died: 1271 (aged 69–70)
- Denomination: Eastern Orthodoxy

Sainthood
- Canonized: by Serbian Orthodox Church

Saint Sava II (Serbian: Свети Сава II, romanized: Sveti Sava II; 1201–1271) was the third Serbian Archbishop, serving from 1263 until his death in 1271. He was the middle son of King Stefan the First-Crowned of the Nemanjić dynasty and his Byzantine wife Eudokia Angelina. He had two brothers, Stefan Radoslav and Stefan Vladislav, and a sister, Komnena. Predislav took the monastic name of Sava, after his uncle, Saint Sava, the first Serbian archbishop. The Serbian Orthodox Church celebrates him as a saint and his feast-day is 21 February.

Born as Predislav (Serbian Cyrillic: Предислав) in c. 1198, he was the middle son of King Stefan the First-Crowned and Eudokia Angelina. He had brothers Stefan Radoslav (b. 1192), Stefan Vladislav (b. 1198), and half-brother Stefan Uroš I (b. 1223). He also had two sisters, Komnena being the only one whose name is known.

King Stefan the First-Crowned, who had become ill, took monastic vows and died in 1227. Radoslav who was the eldest son succeeded as King, crowned at Žiča by Archbishop Sava, his uncle. The younger sons, Vladislav and Uroš I, received appanages. Sava II (Predislav) was appointed bishop of Hum shortly thereafter, later serving as archbishop of Serbia (1263–1270). The Church and state was thus dominated by the same family and the ties between the two as well as the family's role within the Church continued.

== See also ==
- List of saints of the Serbian Orthodox Church
- List of heads of the Serbian Orthodox Church

Religious titles
Preceded by Arsenije I	Serbian Archbishop; 1263–1271	Succeeded by Danilo I

== Sources ==
- Bataković, Dušan T., ed. (2005). Histoire du peuple serbe [History of the Serbian People] (in French). Lausanne: L’Age d’Homme.
- Čanak-Medić, Milka; Todić, Branislav (2017). The Monastery of the Patriarchate of Peć. Novi Sad: Platoneum, Beseda. ISBN 9788685869839.
- Ćirković, Sima (2004). The Serbs. Malden: Blackwell Publishing.
- Curta, Florin (2019). Eastern Europe in the Middle Ages (500–1300). Leiden and Boston: Brill.
- Fine, John Van Antwerp Jr. (1994) [1987]. The Late Medieval Balkans: A Critical Survey from the Late Twelfth Century to the Ottoman Conquest. Ann Arbor, Michigan: University of Michigan Press.
- Ivić, Pavle, ed. (1995). The History of Serbian Culture. Edgware: Porthill Publishers.
