= Arsenije Sremac =

Serbian archbishop and saint

Saint Arsenije Sremac Serbian Archbishop
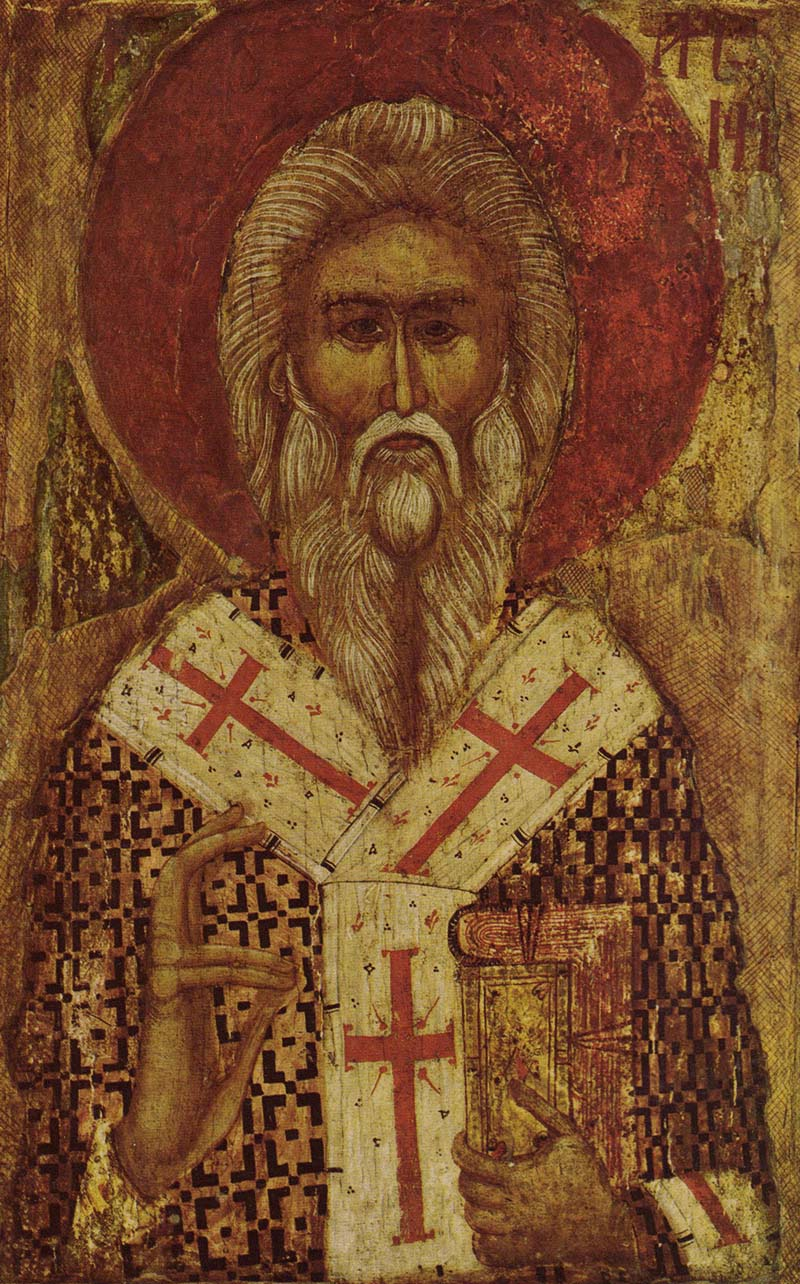
- Fresco depicting Arsenije I in the Visoki Dečani Monastery
- Church: Serbian Orthodox Church
- Installed: 1233
- Term ended: 1263
- Predecessor: Saint Sava
- Successor: Saint Sava II

Personal details
- Born: Stari Slankamen, Kingdom of Syrmia (now Serbia)
- Died: 28 October 1266 Crnča, Kingdom of Serbia (now Montenegro)
- Buried: Ždrebaonik Monastery, Danilovgrad, Montenegro
- Denomination: Eastern Orthodoxy

Sainthood
- Canonized: by Serbian Orthodox Church

Arsenije Sremac (Serbian: Арсеније Сремац, Arsenius the Syrmian; fl. 1219 – 28 October 1266) was the second Serbian Archbishop (1233–1263) and a disciple of Saint Sava of Serbia.

== Early life ==
His place of birth is not precisely determined but it is believed to be in the village of Dabar, near Slankamen (today Stari Slankamen), at the time part of the Kingdom of Syrmia (modern Syrmia, Serbia). The exact date of his birth is unknown. He took monastic vows, probably in St. Demetrius Monastery in today's Sremska Mitrovica. When he heard of St. Sava's work, he was impressed and left for the monastery of Žiča. He soon became St. Sava's disciple and his synkellos. He was appointed as the ecclesiarch of the monastery and later Archimandrite of Žiča, because of his religious life.

When Serbia was invaded by Hungary, St. Sava sent St. Arsenius to find a safer place in the south to establish a new episcopal see. Arsenius chose Peć, where he built a monastery and a church which was at first dedicated to the Holy Apostles, and then to the Lord's Ascension.

== Archbishop ==
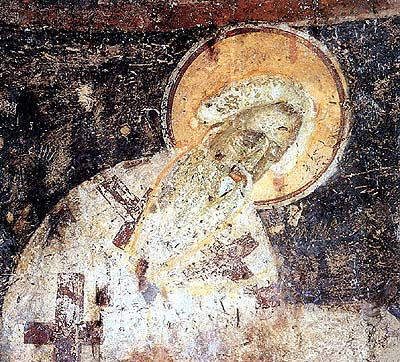
Fresco depicting Arsenije Sremac in the Church of the Holy Apostles at the Patriarchate of Peć Monastery

When St. Sava decided to abdicate, he decided that Arsenije would succeed him. Arsenije was consecrated bishop. He was able to continue in the work of his predecessor. He built Monastery of Peć and participated in the translation of St. Sava's relics from Trnovo to the monastery of Mileševa. St. Arsenije crowned King Stefan Uroš I. He helped King Stefan Uroš I and Queen Helen in building the monasteries Sopoćani and Gradac.

He suffered a stroke in 1263, after which he was succeeded by Saint Sava II, nephew of Saint Sava. St. Arsenije died on October 28, 1266.

His relics were buried at the Pech monastery but now rest at the Ždrebaonik Monastery in Montenegro. His feast day is celebrated according to the Orthodox liturgical calendar on October 28 (Julian Calendar, i.e. November 10 of the Gregorian Calendar).

== See also ==
- List of saints of the Serbian Orthodox Church
- List of heads of the Serbian Orthodox Church
- Saint Arsenije Serbian Orthodox Seminary
- Saint Arsenije Sremac Serbian Orthodox Church

Religious titles
Preceded by Sava I	Serbian Archbishop; 1233–1263	Succeeded by Sava II

== Sources ==
- Bataković, Dušan T., ed. (2005). Histoire du peuple serbe [History of the Serbian People] (in French). Lausanne: L’Age d’Homme. ISBN 978-2825119587.
- Ćirković, Sima (2004). The Serbs. Malden: Blackwell Publishing.
