= Danilo Petrović =

Danilo Petrović may refer to:

- Danilo I, Metropolitan of Cetinje, Metropolitan of Cetinje, 1697–1735
- Danilo I, Prince of Montenegro, ruling Prince of Montenegro, 1851–1860
- Danilo, Crown Prince of Montenegro (1871–1939), Crown Prince of Montenegro
- Danilo Petrović (tennis), Serbian tennis player
- Danilo Petrović (basketball), Serbian basketball player

== See also ==
- Petrović (surname)
