= Danilo I, Serbian Archbishop =

Archbishop of Serbs from 1271 to 1272

Danilo I
- Serbian Archbishop
- Church: Serbian Orthodox Church
- Installed: 8 February 1271
- Term ended: 1272
- Predecessor: Sava II
- Successor: Joanikije I

Personal details
- Denomination: Eastern Orthodoxy

Danilo I (Serbian: Данило I, fl. 1271–72) was the fourth Serbian Archbishop. After the death of Archbishop Sava II (s. 1263–1271) on 8 February 1271, Danilo was chosen as the next Archbishop. However, he was replaced after a year in 1272 by Joanikije I (s. 1272–1276). Archbishop Danilo II (s. 1324–1337) wrote "Archbishop Danilo succeeded on the holy seat, but due to some cause was removed". The cause of his removal is unknown, it may have been due to Danilo having been unsupportive of King Stefan Uroš I (and supportive of Stefan Dragutin); this theory is strengthened by the fact that Danilo's successor Joanikije was a fanatic supporter of Uroš I. It is unlikely that Danilo II did not know the cause of Danilo I's removal.

He wrote medieval biographies of Stefan Dragutin (before 1316), Stefan Milutin (after April 1332) and Helen of Anjou (1317 or soon after). In an effort to strengthen the rule of Stefan Milutin, Danilo highlighted that Helen (born as Roman Catholic) accustomed herself to and accepted Serbian Orthodox Church.

== See also ==
- List of heads of the Serbian Orthodox Church

Religious titles
Preceded by Sava II	Serbian Archbishop; 1271–1272	Succeeded by Joanikije I
