= Danilo II =

Danilo II may refer to:

- Danilo II (Serbian Archbishop), primate of the Serbian Orthodox Church (1324–1337)
- Danilo II, Metropolitan of Montenegro

== See also ==
- Danilo II Petrovic Njegos
- Danilo II, Crown Prince of Montenegro
- Danilo I (disambiguation)
- Danilo III (disambiguation)
