= Josif Cvijović =

Metropolitan of Skopje

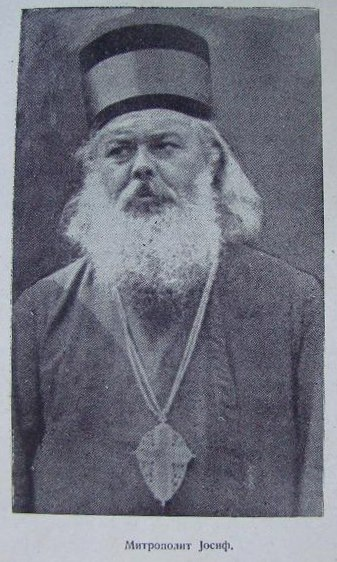
Metropolitan Josif

Josif Cvijović (Serbian: Јосиф Цвијовић; 28 August (Julian calendar) 1878 – 3 July 1957) was the Bishop of Bitola from 1920 to 1931 and Metropolitan bishop of the Metropolitanate of Skopje from 1932 to 1957.

== Biography ==
He was born in the village of Drežnik near Užice, to father Krsto Cvijović and mother Jelisaveta. He completed primary school in Požega and six grades of high school in Užice. He graduated from the Faculty of Theology of the Velika škola in Belgrade. He married and was ordained a deacon on 15 September 1903, and a priest on 1 October 1903. He was a priest in the Makovište and then Dragojevići parishes. After becoming a widower, he took monastic vows and was tonsured on 15 September 1913 in the Rakovica Monastery. He graduated from the Kiev Orthodox Theological Academy, where he received his master's degree with a thesis on "The Role of the Serbian Clergy in the Liberation of Their People". After returning from Kiev, he taught for a time at the Belgrade Theological Seminary of Saint Sava (now renamed Saint Sava's Seminary). Later, he headed the Monastic School at the Rakovica Monastery

Cvijiović participated in the Balkan Wars and World War I, where he was a military chaplain in the Chetnik detachment of Vojvode Vuk. He was sent on a diplomatic mission to Bizerte, and to Russia. From 1917, he was rector of the Serbian Orthodox Theological Seminary at Oxford, where he worked together with hieromonk Nikolaj Velimirović and Justin Popović.

=== Bishop of Bitola ===
After the war, Cvijović became rector of the Prizren Orthodox Seminary and from that position was elected on 19 December 1920 as the Bishop of Bitolja. In Bitolja, he founded the Bitolja School of Theology, where the hieromonk (later a saint) John of Shanghai taught. In 1931, the Diocese of Ohrid and the Diocese of Bitolja were united and the seat was set in Bitolja, and the bishop of the united Ohrid and Bitolja Diocese was Nikolaj Velimirović, the former bishop of Ohrid.

During 1930 and 1931, together with the hieromonk Justin Popović, he was sent to Carpathian Russia, which at that time belonged to Czechoslovakia. Their task was to return the Orthodox who had been forcibly converted by the Uniates. Since 1596, after the Union of Brest-Litovsk, the Polish king Sigismund III and the Pope had been imposing a union on the Orthodox. After the Great War, thanks to the democratic president Tomáš Masaryk, they were allowed to return to their original confession -- Orthodoxy—founded as a state religion of the then Roman Empire by Constantine the Great in the 4th century.

=== Metropolitan bishop of Skopje ===
He was elected from the position of Bishop of Bitola to metropolitan bishop of Skopje and enthroned in Skopje on 1 January 1932. In Skopje, he launched the magazine "Christian Work". The Church Museum of Southern Serbia was founded in Skopje at that time thanks to Radoslav Grujić, as well as the first Gallery of Frescoes in the then state. With his and Serbian Patriarch Varnava's merit, the benefactor Persida Milenković decided to build the Vavedenje Monastery in Belgrade. In his native village Drežnik, Metropolitan Josif built a school and a church.

=== War and post-war period ===
After the outbreak of World War II, he was expelled from Skopje by the Bulgarians on May 5, 1941. Cvijović arrived in Belgrade when Serbian Patriarch Gavrilo and Bishop of Žiča Nikolaj Velimirović had already been arrested. Gathered around him, all the bishops present, Jovan (Ilić) of Niš, Simeon (Stanković) of Šabac, Venijamin (Taušanović) of Braničevo, Nektarije (Krulj) of Zvornik-Tuzla, vicars Arsenije (Bradvarević) and Valerijan (Stefanović), formed an ad hoc Bishops' Council of the Serbian Orthodox Church and a quasi Synod, which operated in wartime conditions from 1941 to 1947. The president of this Synod in the absence of the patriarch was Metropolitan Josif of Skopje

During the war, he organized a team of the Serbian Orthodox Church that cooperated with the Commissariat for Refugees Toma Maksimović. After World War II, the Serbian Orthodox Church was left without property and income, then Metropolitan Josif founded the Candle Making Institute in the Serbian Patriarchate building in 1946.

It took sometime for the leadership of the Serbian Orthodox Church to be taken over by Patriarch Gavrilo. Upon his release from the Dachau camp he and Nikolaj Velimirović were bandied about and around Slovenia by desperate Nazis whose foreseeable end was near. Shortly after, Patriarch Gavrilo (Dožić) and Bishop Nikolaj (Velimirović) were moved to Austria, where they were finally liberated by the US 36th Infantry Division in Tyrol in 1945.

By then Gavrilo was physically weakened by these vicissitudes and grew to look very old and frail. Soon after, Dožić and Velimirović were flown to London, England at Westminster Abbey by the Yugoslav government-in-exile for the baptism of King Peter II of Yugoslavia's son and heir, Crown Prince Alexander of Yugoslavia. Patriarch Gavrilo (Dožić) then returned to what then came to be known as the Socialist Federal Republic of Yugoslavia, while Bishop Nikolaj (Velimirović) opted to emigrate to the United States.

Meanwhile, Metropolitan Josif (Cvijović), together with his associates, wrote the "Report of the Holy Synod of Bishops to the Holy Council of Bishops of the Serbian Orthodox Church on the Work from 1941 to 1947", a text of about 500 typewritten pages that testifies to the difficult war period and which was adopted by the Council of the Serbian Orthodox Church in 1947.

Later, the Yugoslav communist authorities did not allow him to return to Skopje and take over the management of his diocese. He then settled in Vranje to administer a part of the Eparchy of Skopje to which Vranje belonged. However, he was expelled from there as well. From April 1945 to November 1946, he was the administrator of the Metropolitanate of Montenegro and the Littoral. In the second half of 1950, he was arrested and held in prison without trial, later detained in the Žiča monastery. After his release, in late November 1951, he was the administrator of the Eparchy of Žiča for almost 18 months in the absence of Bishop Nikolaj Velimirović. When he fell ill, he lived in the Vavedenje Monastery in Belgrade, where he died on 3 July 1957. He was buried in the monastery courtyard next to the Metropolitan Dositej of Zagreb.

== Legacy ==
After World War II, the canonically unrecognized Macedonian Orthodox Church — Ohrid Archbishopric was established in the territory of Macedonia, but the 2002 Niški sporazum (2002 Niš Agreement) somewhat pacified the schism, thus ending it by 2022.

Metropolitan Josif (Cvijović) wrote "List of Serbian Memoirs", 1st edition "Svetigora", published in Cetinje, 2006, 391 pages, COBISS 1536958185. The second edition was in 2008. His deacon Dobrivoje Kapisazović wrote the book "Anecdotes from the Life of Serbian Metropolitan Josif Cvijović (1878-1957) with Short Biographical Data", published by the author, Belgrade 1982, 93 pages. In addition, the book "The Wise Ploughman of the Lord's Field: A Memorial to Joseph Cvijović, Bishop of Bitola and Metropolitan of Skopje", was published in 2007 by "Svetigora", 445 pages.

On the occasion of the 130th anniversary of his birth, on 28 August 2008, a Memorial House dedicated to the life and work of Metropolitan Josif was officially opened in his birth village of Drežnik.

== Personal ==
Mileva Karakašević, Josif's granddaughter, also attended the event. Before becoming a cleric, Cvijović and his wife Mileva had two daughters, the first child was born in May 1904 and lived while the second daughter, born in September 1905 died on 1 November 1905, and his wife, 20 days after giving birth, died on 21 November 1905. This tragedy altered Cvijović's life altogether.

== Gallery ==
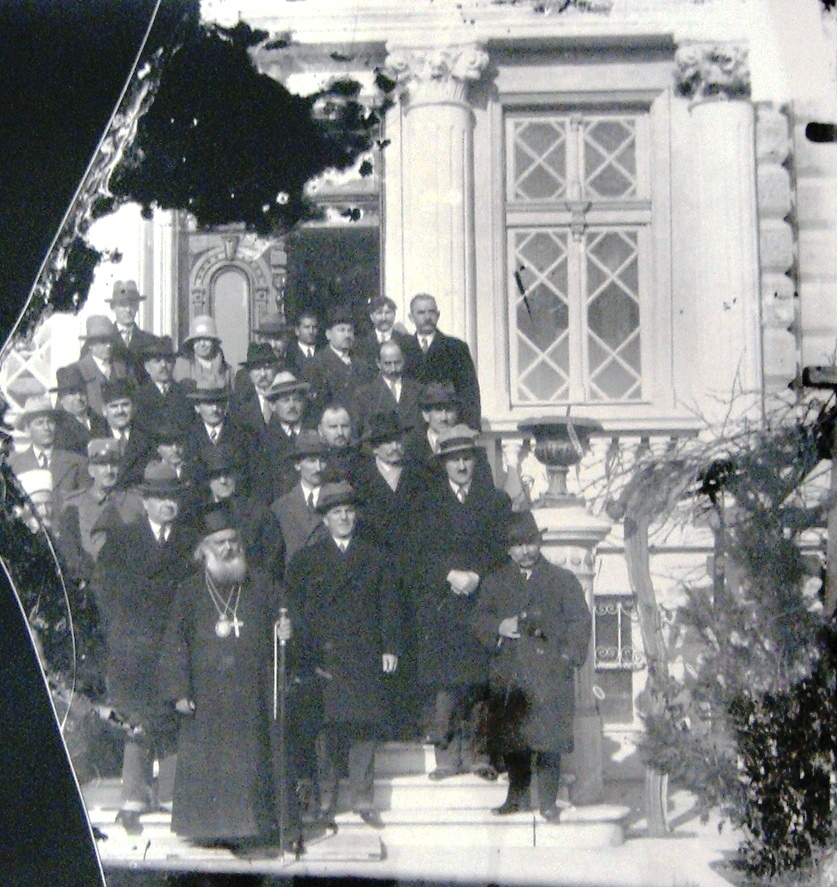
Vladika Josif in Bitolja

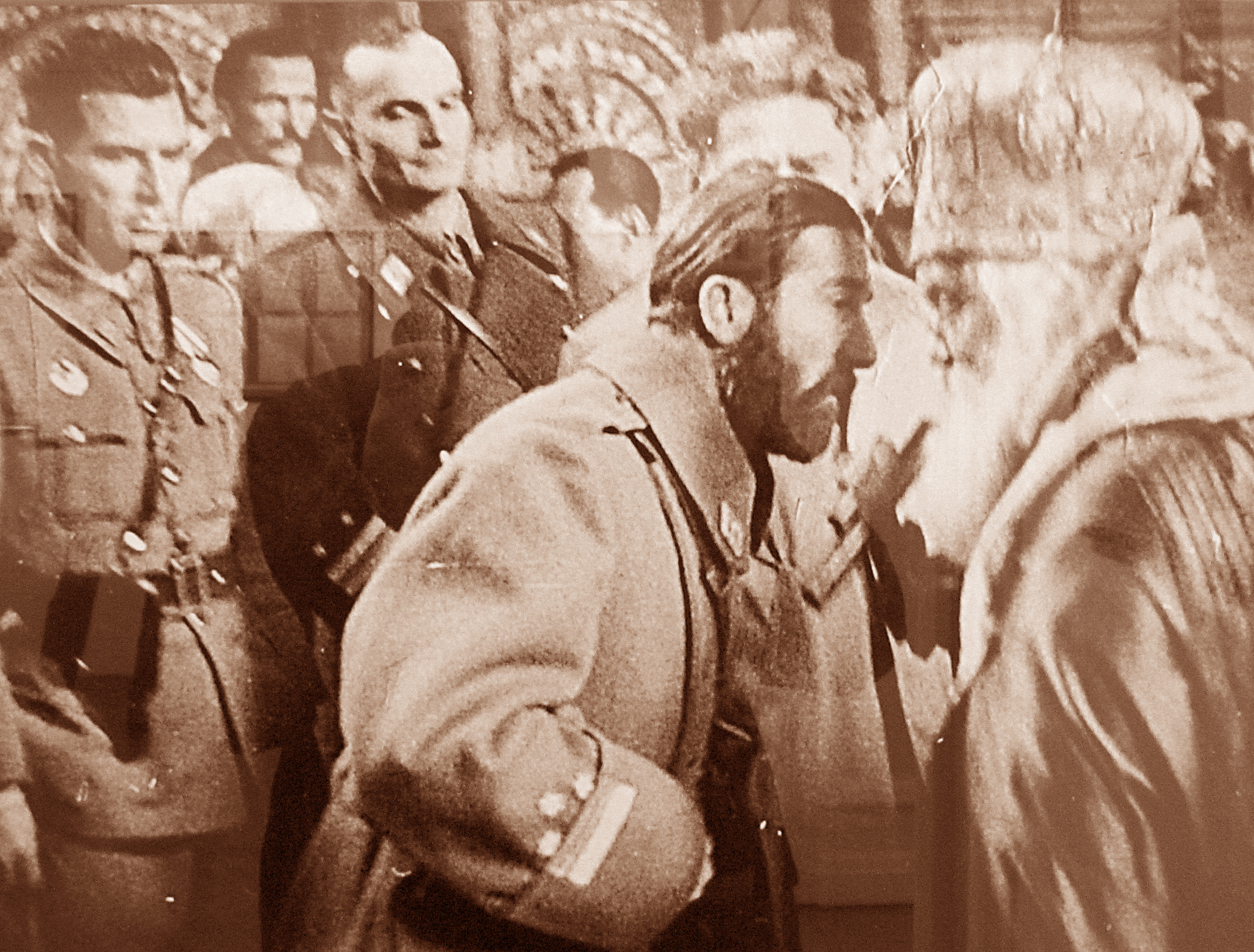
Vlada Zečević and Metropolitan Josif November 1944.

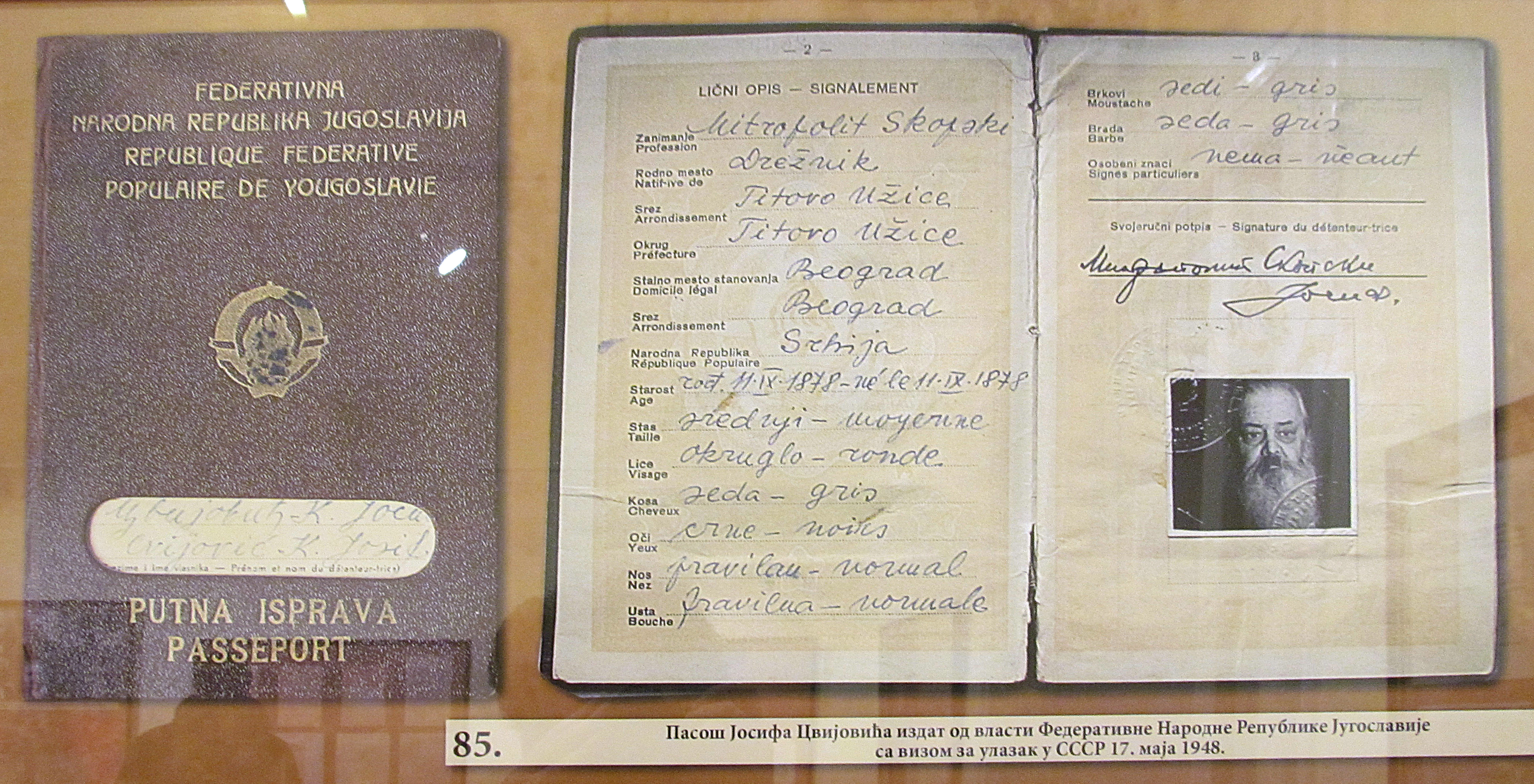
Passport of Metropolitan Josif, 1948.

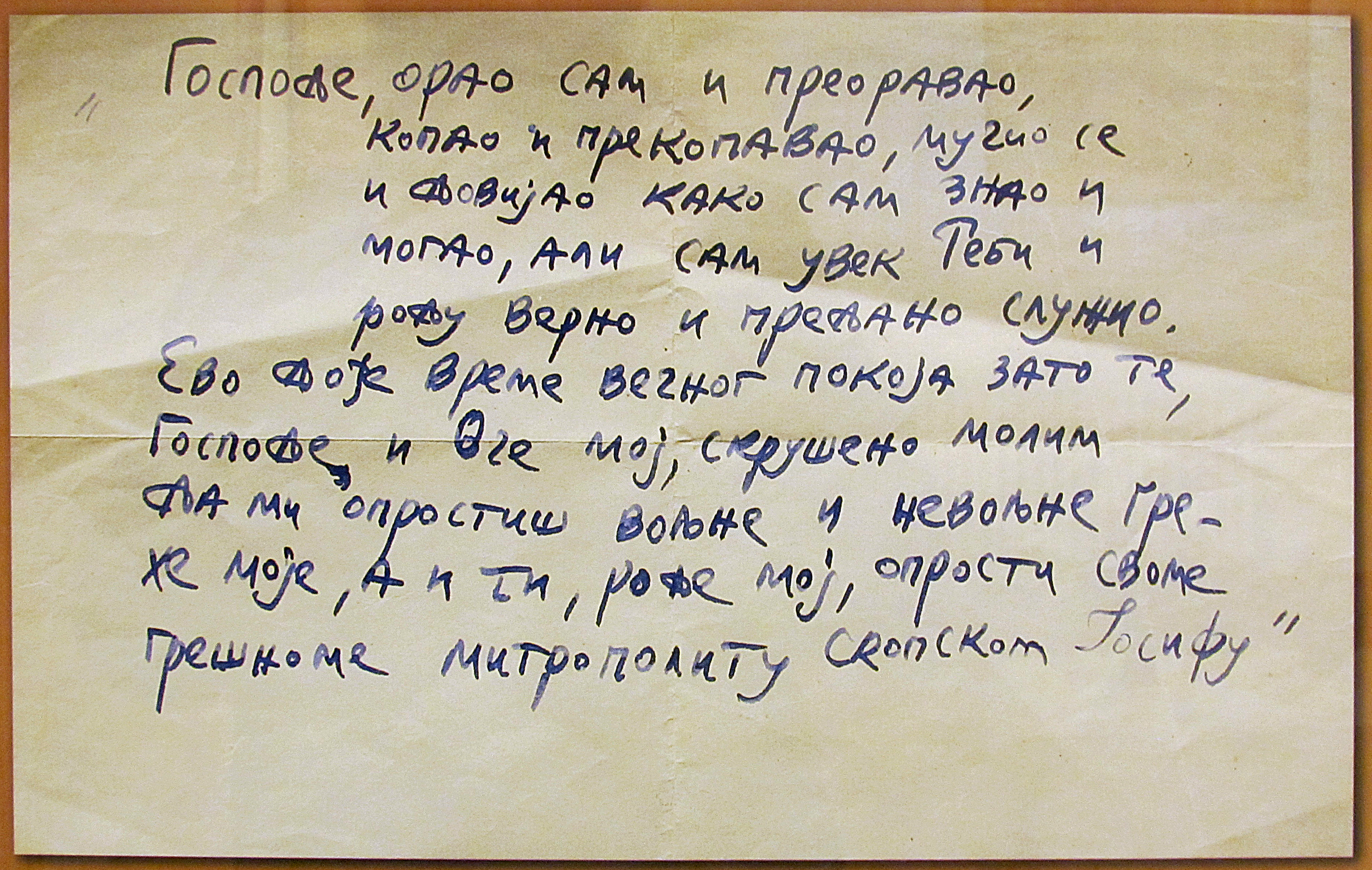
Josif's own epitaph.
