= Persida Milenković =

Persida "Persa" Milenković (Serbian Cyrillic: Персида Миленковић; 1857 – 8 February 1943) was a Serbian philanthropist. She is best remembered as the ktetor of Vavedenje Monastery in Belgrade's Senjak suburb.

== Biography ==
Persida Milenković was born in Šabac (at the time in the Principality of Serbia) to Nikodije Ćirić and Jelka. The family moved to Belgrade, where Nikodije was employed at the Ministry of Construction.

Persida attended Belgrade's Gymnasium for Women where she received a well-rounded education in Serbian, Russian, Old Church Slavonic, history, geography, sciences, and mathematics. However, society at the time shared the widely held opinion that a university was no place for a woman.

In her first marriage, Persida had a son, Vojislav, who died in infancy, and when she became a widow in 1880 at 23, she decided to remarry three years later in 1883 to a wealthy Belgrade merchant. Subsequently, her marriage to Rista Milenković at 26 made her wealthy and cautious of the inheritance. Together with her husband, they decided to channel the wealth towards numerous benefactions.

In 1924, the Church of the Holy Trinity in Kumodraž was built on the initiative of Persida Milenković, and on the advice of the local voivode Stepa Stepanović (1856-1929). She also contributed to the founding of the Vavedenje Monastery in Senjak, which was built in Belgrade in 1937. In Belgrade in the 1930s, with her two wealthy colleagues Vlada Ilić and Đorđe Vajfert, she initiated and spearheaded a social housing project for homeless and disadvantaged families, becoming the first woman elected member and chairman of a building society.

Her first two endowments were the church in Torlak and a school for female teachers at Kraljica Natalija Street, now the site of the Belgrade Mathematical Gymnasium. She also donated land for the construction of an orphanage, and bequeathed her assets to the Red Cross in her will. In honor of her work, a street in the Senjak district was dedicated to her.

Persida Milenković died during the German occupation of Yugoslavia on 8 February 1943 in Belgrade. She was buried in the Monastery of the Presentation of the Mother of God, better known as Vavedenje, the same one she helped build in 1936. Her funeral was attended by Metropolitan Josif Cvijović, Minister of Education Velibor Jonić and Serbian Prime Minister General Milan Nedić.
