= German, Serbian Patriarch =

Patriarch of the Serbian Orthodox Church from 1958 to 1990

His Holiness German
- Archbishop of Peć, Metropolitan of Belgrade and Karlovci, and Serbian Patriarch
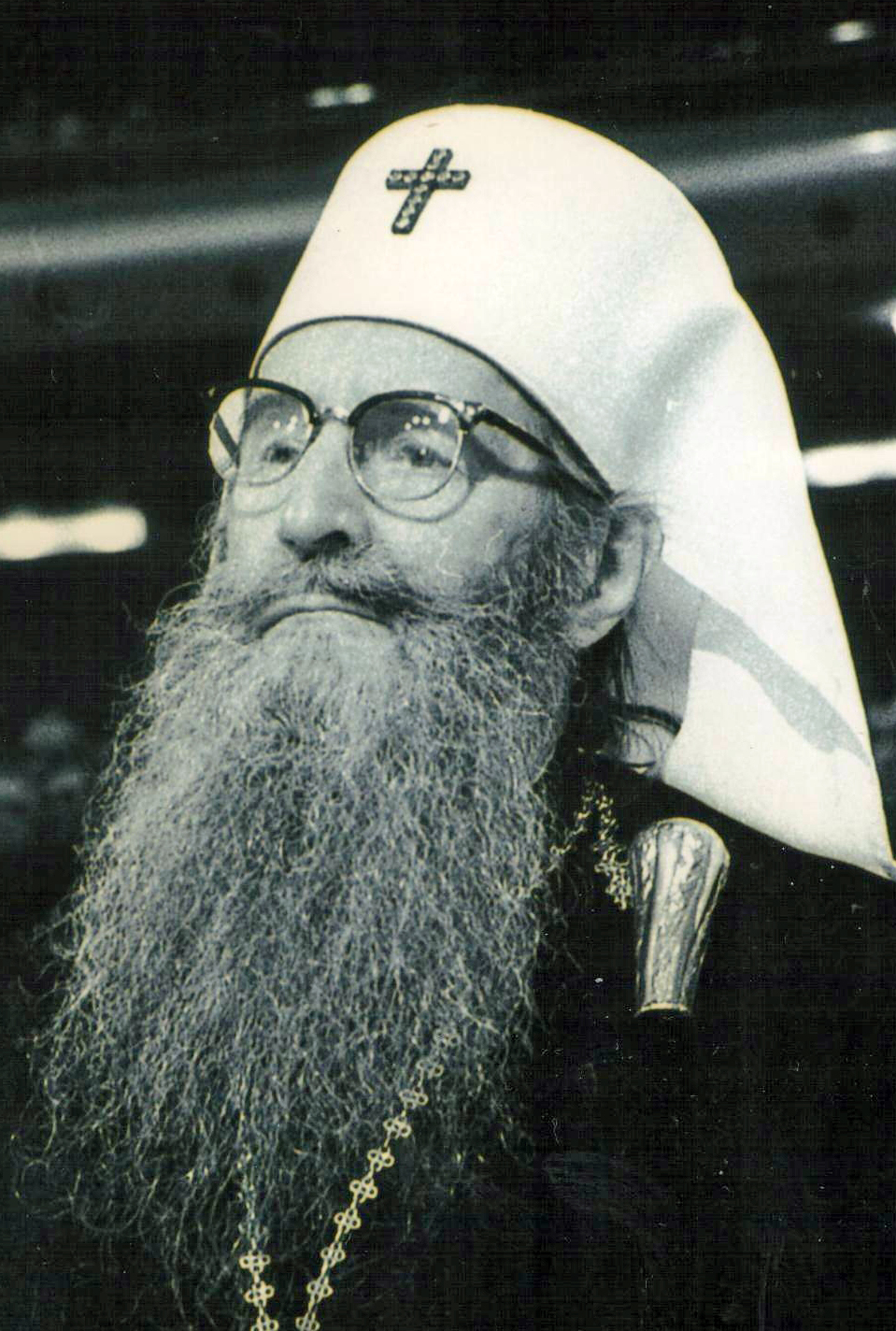
- Church: Serbian Orthodox Church
- See: Belgrade
- Installed: 14 September 1958
- Retired: 30 November 1990
- Predecessor: Vikentije II
- Successor: Pavle

Orders
- Ordination: 1927
- Consecration: 1951

Personal details
- Born: 19 August 1899 Jošanička Banja, Kingdom of Serbia
- Died: 27 August 1991 (aged 92) Belgrade, SFR Yugoslavia
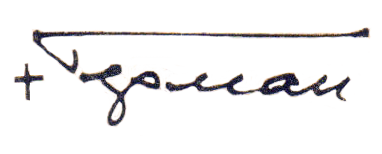
- Signature

Styles of Serbian Patriarch German
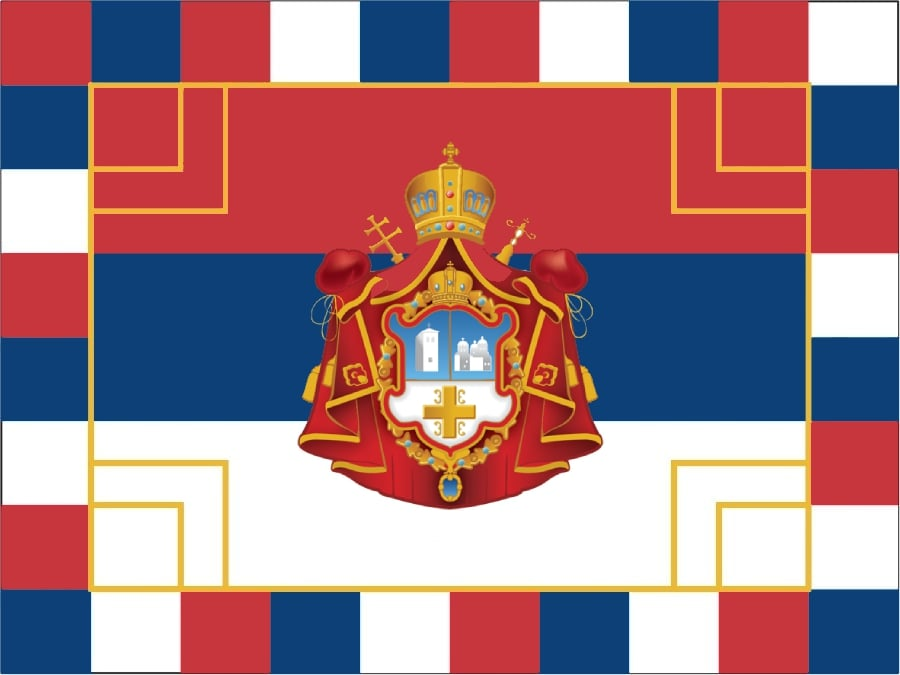
- Reference style: His Holiness
- Spoken style: Your Holiness
- Religious style: Patriarch
- Posthumous style: His Holiness Patriarch German of Blessed Repose

German (Serbian: Герман, English: Herman; born Hranislav Đorić; 19 August 1899 – 27 August 1991) was the 43rd Patriarch of the Serbian Orthodox Church, serving from 1958 to 1990. He was noted for revitalizing the Serbian Orthodox Church to a certain extent during the communist period, despite two schisms that occurred during his tenure.

== Early life ==
German was born as Hranislav Đorić on 19 August 1899 in the spa town of Jošanička Banja in central Serbia, in a family of teachers, and latter priest. His father, Mihajlo Đorić of Velika Drenova, graduated from the prestigious Saint Sava Seminary in Belgrade in 1895. Đorić received a broad education and was among most educated members of the Serbian clergy, attending primary school in Velika Drenova and Kruševac, seminaries in Belgrade and Sremski Karlovci (graduating in 1921), studying law at the University of Sorbonne and finally graduating from the Faculty of Orthodox Theology of the University of Belgrade in 1942.

He was ordained a deacon by the bishop of Žiča Jefrem, and appointed the clerk of the Canon-law Court in Čačak and also a catechist in the Čačak Gymnasium. Due to ill health, he left the administrative jobs and 1927, he was ordained a presbyter, receiving his own parish of Miokovci. In 1931 he was transferred to a parish in Vrnjačka Banja. After the election of Patriarch Gavrilo V in 1938, father Hranislav became a referent of the Holy Synod of the Serbian Orthodox Church. In that capacity, he was elected a vicar bishop of Moravica and, becoming a widower, he took monastic vows in Studenica Monastery on 7 July 1951, acquiring the name German (Herman). Patriarch Vikentije II, together with bishops Valerijan of Šumadija, Nikanor of Bačka, and Vasilije of Banja Luka, ordained him a bishop on 15 July in Cathedral of Saint Archangel Michael in Belgrade. The new bishop became at the same time the secretary general of the Holy Synod and editor in chief of the Glasnik, the official gazette of the Serbian Orthodox Church.

In 1952 he was appointed a bishop of the Eparchy of Buda. However, as Hungarian authorities didn't approve his appointment neither allowed him to enter the country, so he was never officially enthroned. In 1956 he was appointed the bishop of Žiča, at that time, semi-officially, the second office of importance in the church, after the patriarch. In this capacity, he was also an administrator of Budimlja and Polimlje and Raška and Prizren eparchies.

== Patriarch ==
=== Appointment controversy ===
When Patriarch Vikentije II suddenly died on 5 July 1958, internal strife struck the church leadership and no agreement could be reached on who would succeed him. German was not even appointed as the guardian of the throne (acting patriarch), instead the bishop of Braničevo, Hrizostom Vojinović, was appointed to vacate the post. It is believed that German's election was a compromise, but the still popular story is that Aleksandar Ranković, the top Serbian Communist official at the time, and later Josip Broz Tito's deputy, entered the session of the Holy Synod, bringing German inside, and saying: "This is your new patriarch!". German was thus elected as the 43rd Serbian Patriarch on 14 September 1958.

=== Schisms ===
Like most Eastern Orthodox churches in the Eastern Bloc, the Serbian Orthodox Church under German was forced to strike a modus vivendi with the Communist regime in order to procure the space it needed to operate. The diaspora priests, led by the vocally anti-communist Bishop Dionisije Milivojević, claimed that the Belgrade "red priests" had acquiesced too early. After the Holy Synod started a trial against Dionisije for allegations about his personal life, he went into schism with the church in November 1963. Starting in 1977, the group of diaspora bishops established Free Serbian Orthodox Church.

The schism of the Macedonian Orthodox Church was a much deeper and complicated issue. It began in 1958, the very year of German's election, with an allegedly willing acceptance of the autonomy of Archbishop of Ohrid and Macedonia proclaimed by the archbishop Dositej, Metropolitan of Skopje. This was a great blow to Patriarch German's authority as it was a forced acceptance, pushed by the Communist regime. In the next 9 years, the patriarch and archbishop held several joint liturgies, even with the heads of other Orthodox Churches. However, in 1967, archbishop Dositej completely split his archbishopric (within the borders of the Socialist Republic of Macedonia) from the mother church, claiming heritage from the historical Archbishopric of Ohrid, which had been non-existent for two centuries. Patriarch German and the Serbian Orthodox Church, claiming the separation was forced and uncanonical (in other words, they deemed it a church established by the Communists) ended any canonical communication with the Macedonian Orthodox Church. In turn, Patriarch German's example was followed by all the other Orthodox Churches. The problem continued after German and the breakup of Yugoslavia, and it became a highly political issue, not only with the Serbian Orthodox Church, but with the Church of Greece and the Bulgarian Orthodox Church. This schism continued until 2022, when the Macedonian Orthodox Church reconciled with the Serbian Orthodox Church and was granted full autonomy and subsequently autocephaly by Patriarch Porfirije.

=== Revitalization of the Church ===
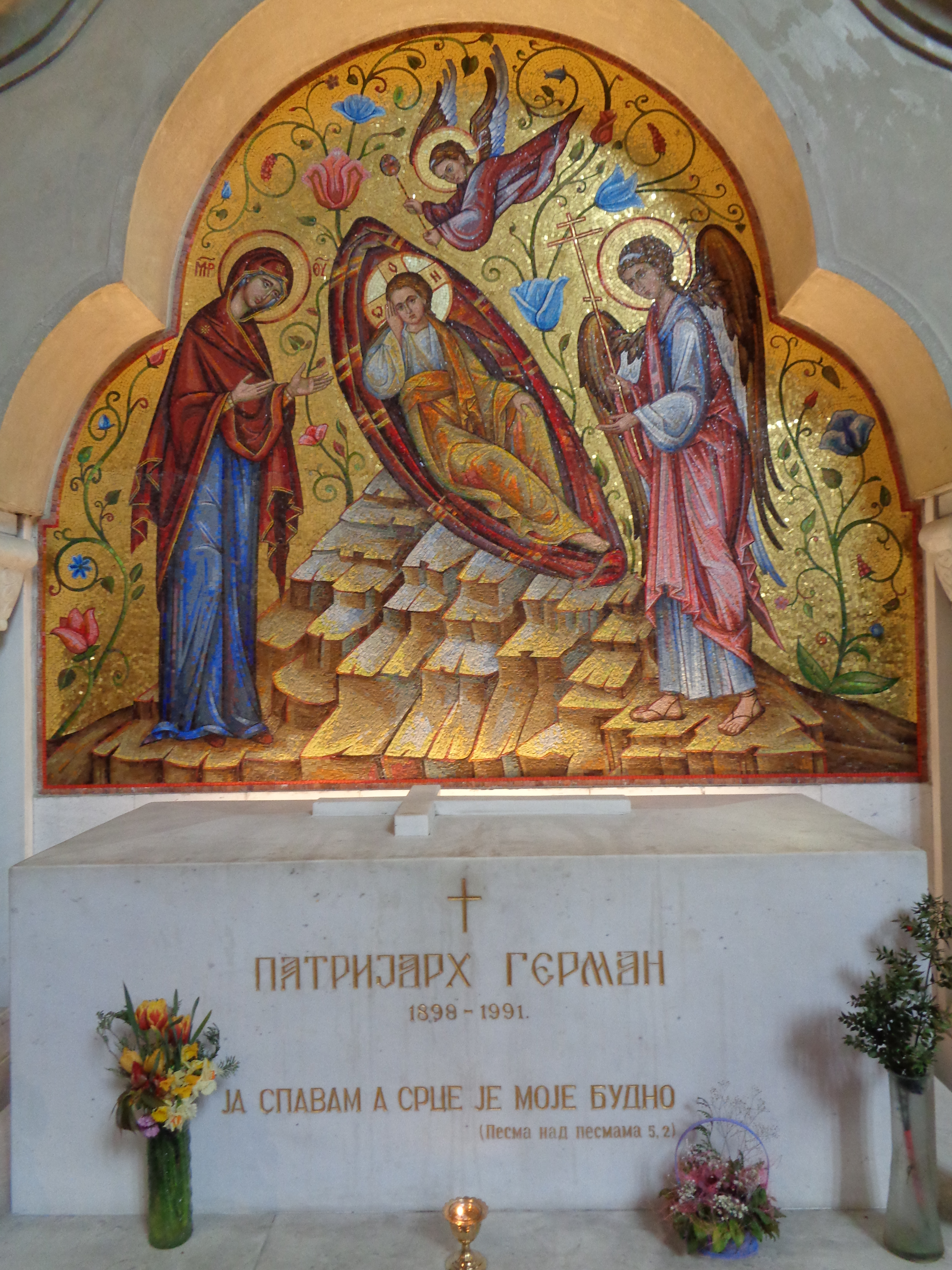
Tomb of Patriarch German at the Church of Saint Mark in Belgrade

Patriarch German set to revitalize the Serbian Orthodox Church, which (like other religious communities in Yugoslavia) received no state support. Throughout his tenure, he kept a low profile, while achieving certain goals in this direction. Despite harsh conditions, he managed to form several new dioceses: Western Europe (1969), Australia (1973), Vranje (1975), and Canada (1983). He oversaw the completion of Serbian Orthodox Seminary in Belgrade (including the campus) in 1958. He also opened new seminary at the Krka monastery in Croatia. He was very involved in appointing bishops, staunchly pushing his own candidates, especially in the case of the Metropolitanate of Montenegro and the Littoral after the Communists arrested Metropolitan Arsenije Bradvarević in 1954, but Patriarch German managed to appoint his protégé, Danilo Dajković in 1961. He also sent many priests to Montenegro as clerical activities had almost completely ceased there after the war.

After the death of Josip Broz Tito in 1980, he slowly pushed church issues as Yugoslav society changed and nationalism grew among the various peoples, and in the end he was universally popular among the Serbs and had become a part of the Serbian social elite. In 1984, German visited the site of the Jasenovac concentration camp, saying a now famous line: "To forgive, we must ...to forget, we must not".

Many consider German's greatest achievement to be his successful campaign for the resumption of the construction of the Church of Saint Sava in Belgrade, which was stopped in 1941. In 26 years from his appointment, he urged the Communist government 88 times until they finally authorized the construction to continue in 1984. Being a massive project, it took a long time and the church was completed only in 2021.

=== Later years ===
In 1989, Patriarch German broke his hip, which led to a series of surgeries and repeated injuries, so the already old patriarch was unable to perform his duties. As a result of this, the Holy Synod declared him incapacitated on 30 November 1990, and appointed the metropolitan bishop of Zagreb and Ljubljana Jovan Pavlović as the guardian of the throne and elected the new patriarch, Pavle, on 1 December 1990. Patriarch German died at the Military Medical Academy in Belgrade on 27 August 1991, aged 92, and was buried in Church of Saint Mark in Belgrade. Patriarch German's tenure of 32 years is one of the longest in the history of the Serbian Orthodox Church.

== Awards and honors ==
- Order of Saint Sava,
- Legion of Honour
- Order of George I
- National Order of the Cedar

== See also ==
- List of heads of the Serbian Orthodox Church
- List of 20th-century religious leaders

Eastern Orthodox Church titles
Preceded by Vikentije II	Serbian Patriarch; 1958–1990	Succeeded by Pavle
Preceded by Nikolaj Velimirović	Bishop of Žiča; 1956–1958	Succeeded by Vasilije Kostić
Preceded by Hrizostom Vojinović	Bishop of Buda; 1952–1956	Succeeded by Arsenije Bradvarević

== Bibliography ==
- Вуковић, Сава (1996). Српски јерарси од деветог до двадесетог века (Serbian Hierarchs from the 9th to the 20th Century). Евро, Унирекс, Каленић.
- Serbian Church in History at the Orthodox Research Institute
- Ko je ko u Jugoslaviji 1970; Hronometar, Belgrade
- Srpska porodična enciklopedija, Vol. VI (2006); Narodna knjiga and Politika NM; ISBN 86-331-2933-7 (NK)
- Mala Prosvetina Enciklopedija, Third edition (1985); Prosveta; ISBN 86-07-00001-2
