= Vikentije II, Serbian Patriarch =

Patriarch of the Serbian Orthodox Church from 1950 to 1958

His Holiness Vikentije II
- Archbishop of Peć, Metropolitan of Belgrade and Karlovci, and Serbian Patriarch
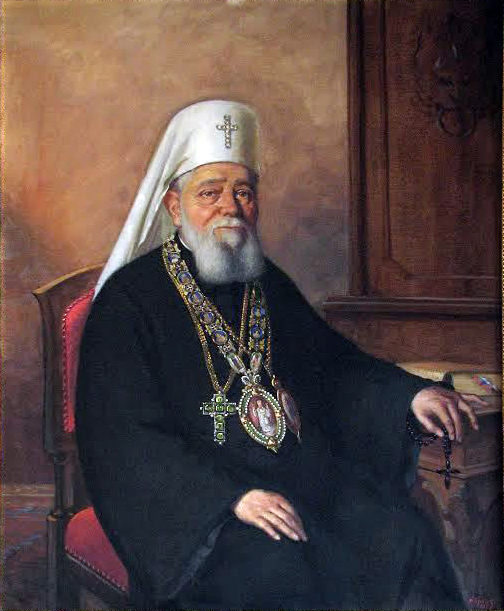
- Church: Serbian Orthodox Church
- See: Belgrade and Karlovci
- Installed: 15 July 1950
- Term ended: 5 July 1958
- Predecessor: Gavrilo V
- Successor: German

Orders
- Ordination: 1917
- Consecration: 1936

Personal details
- Born: August 23, 1890 Bačko Petrovo Selo, Austria-Hungary
- Died: July 5, 1958 Belgrade, Yugoslavia

Styles of Serbian Patriarch Vikentije II
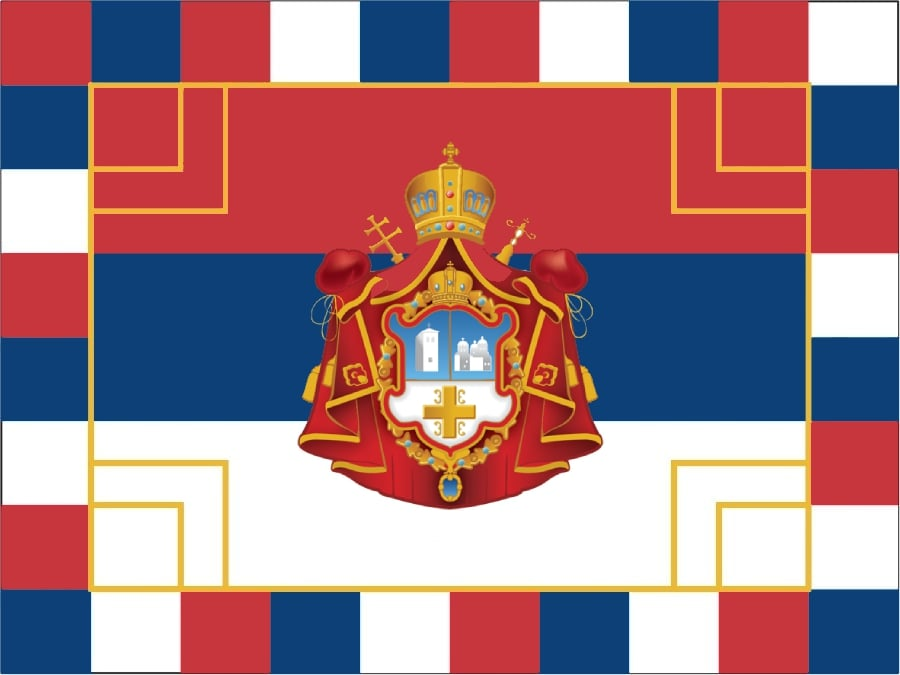
- Reference style: His Holiness
- Spoken style: Your Holiness
- Religious style: Patriarch
- Posthumous style: His Holiness Patriarch Vikentije II of Blessed Repose

Vikentije II (Serbian: Викентије II, English: Vicentius II; born Vitomir Prodanov; 23 August 1890 – 5 July 1958) was the 42nd Patriarch of the Serbian Orthodox Church, serving from 1950 until his death in 1958.

== Early life ==
Vikentije II was born as Vitomir Prodanov on 23 August 1890, in the village of Bačko Petrovo Selo, then part of Austria-Hungary. His parents were Đorđe and Jelka Prodanov. He completed his elementary education in Bačko Petrovo Selo in 1901. After that, he entered the Serbian Gymnasium in Novi Sad from which he graduated in 1909. Prodanov continued his higher education at the Sremski Karlovci Seminary, graduating in 1913. He then returned to Bačko Petrovo Selo as a teacher. On 1 June 1917, Bishop Georgije Letić of Timișoara appointed him consistorial sub-notary for the Eparchy of Timișoara.

On 18 August 1917, Prodanov took monastic vows in Bezdin Monastery (in what is now Romania) before Archimandrite and was given the name Vikentije and was ordained a deacon on 12 September that same year. In 1919, he was transferred to the post of a consistorial notary of the Eparchy of Bačka. He was raised to the dignity of protodeacon and then archdeacon. From 1921 to 1932 Prodanov served as secretary of the executive board of Serbian Orthodox monasteries. During this time he continued his education at the Faculty of Philosophy of the University of Belgrade studying Serbian and Byzantine History, graduating in 1929. On 31 October 1929, he was ordained a hieromonk, and on 3 December, he was raised to the rank of archimandrite. In 1932, Vikentije was elected Secretary-General of the Holy Synod of the Serbian Orthodox Church remaining in that post until he was elected Titular bishop of Marča on 4 July 1932.

Vikentije was a historian and a member of the Society of Historians of Vojvodina and editor-in-chief of its gazette.

== Bishop of Zletovo and Strumica ==
Vikentije remained an auxiliary bishop until 1939 when he was elected Bishop of Zletovo and Strumica. In 1940, he was additionally assigned the task of administrating the Eparchy of Ohrid and Bitola. After the Germans and Bulgarians occupied his eparchies in 1941, he was exiled by Bulgarian fascists and fled to Belgrade. After World War II, the Communist regime of Yugoslavia did not allow him to return to his duties because they wanted to create a separate Macedonian Orthodox Church. From 1947 to 1950, Vikentije was the administrator of the Eparchy of Žiča.

== Serbian Patriarch ==
Vikentije II was elected Serbian Patriarch on 14 July 1950. He placed enormous energy into trying to resolve the problem of retirement funds for clergy of the Serbian Orthodox Church. Vikentije II was the first Serbian Patriarch to visit Russia in almost 50 years. He was strongly opposed to the splitting of the Serbian Orthodox Church and the establishment of a separate Macedonian Orthodox Church.

Patriarch Vikentije II died on 5 July 1958 under mysterious circumstances (like Patriarch Varnava before him) after a session of the Council of Bishops at which the council rejected suggestions from the communist regime to approve the establishment of a separate Macedonian Orthodox Church. He was buried in the tomb of Metropolitan Mihailo in the Cathedral of Saint Archangel Michael in Belgrade.

== See also ==
- List of heads of the Serbian Orthodox Church
- List of 20th-century religious leaders

Eastern Orthodox Church titles
Preceded by Gavrilo V	Serbian Patriarch; 1950–1958	Succeeded by German
Preceded by Simeon Stanković	Bishop of Zletovo and Strumica; 1939–1950	Vacant Title next held by Naum Dimovski
