= Jošanička Banja =

Jošanička Banja Јошаничка Бања
- Town
- Location within Serbia
- Coordinates: 43°23′21″N 20°45′08″E
- Country: Serbia
- District: Raška
- Municipality: Raška

Area
  - Total: 36.61 km^{2} (14.14 sq mi)
- Elevation: 550 m (1,800 ft)

Population (2011)
  - Total: 1,036
  - Density: 28.30/km^{2} (73.29/sq mi)
- Time zone: UTC+1 (CET)
  - Summer (DST): UTC+2 (CEST)
- Postal code: 36345
- Area code: (+381) 15
- Car plates: KV
- Website: josanickabanja.rs

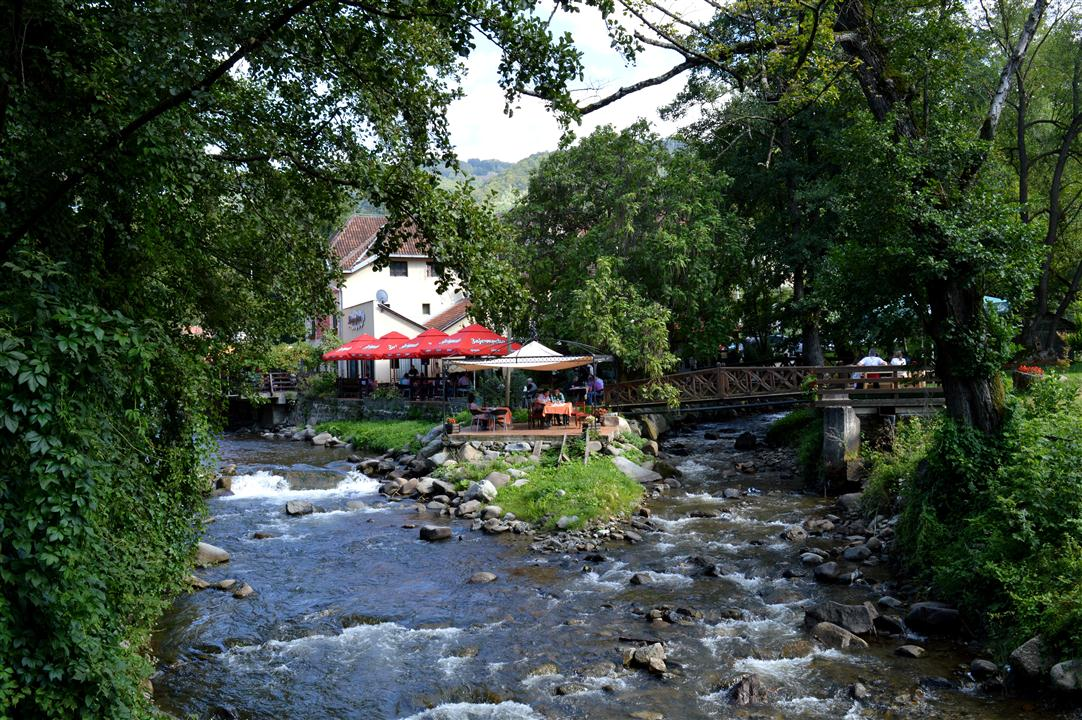
Jošanička Banja

Jošanička Banja (Serbian Cyrillic: Јошаничка Бања) is a spa town located in the municipality of Raška, southwestern Serbia. As of 2011 census, it has a population of 1,036 inhabitants.

== History ==
In 500 BC, Hellenistic pottery including Megarian bowls were excavated in the town.

It is assumed that the healing waters of Jošanička Banja were known to the ancient Romans, and that their beneficial effect was also used by the Turks, as evidenced by a hammam from the 18th century.

The healing properties of the water were formally examined in 1834, per request of Prince Miloš.

== Notable individuals ==
- German, Serbian Patriarch

== See also ==
- List of spa towns in Serbia
