= Holy Trinity Cathedral, Kraljevo =

Cathedral in Kraljevo, Serbia

Holy Trinity Cathedral
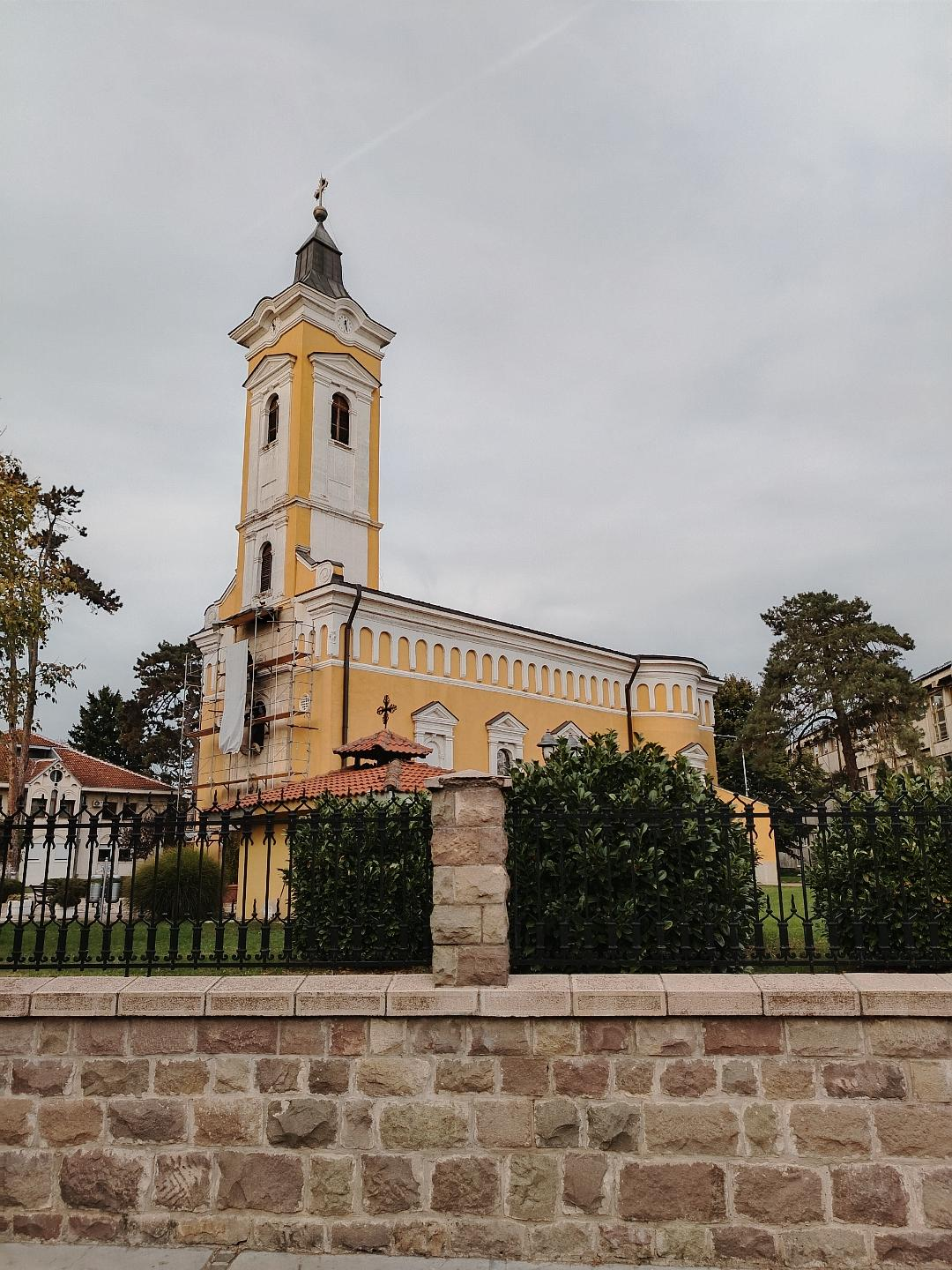
- Holy Trinity Cathedral, pictured in 2024
- Holy Trinity Cathedral
- 43°43′33″N 20°41′00″E
- Location: Kraljevo
- Country: Serbia
- Denomination: Serbian Orthodox

History
- Status: Church
- Dedication: Holy Trinity

Architecture
- Functional status: Active
- Style: Neo-Byzantine
- Years built: 1824; 202 years ago

Administration
- Archdiocese: Eparchy of Žiča

The Holy Trinity Cathedral (Serbian: Саборна црква Свете Тројице) is an Eastern Orthodox church located in Kraljevo, Serbia. It is under jurisdiction of the Eparchy of Žiča of the Serbian Orthodox Church and serves as its cathedral church.

Built between 1822 and 1824, church was founded by Prince Miloš Obrenović as one of his notable endowments, near the location where the Second Serbian Uprising was initiated.

== History ==
In the early 1800s the town had a small wooden church located in the district of Stara Čaršija. Prince Miloš, who frequently visited and prayed there for liberation from the Ottoman rule, decided to rebuild the church as a sign of gratitude to God for the victory. In 1824, Prince Miloš Obrenović initiated the construction of a new church dedicated to the Holy Trinity. During this period, the original wooden church was relocated and continued to serve as a place of worship until the new structure was completed.

Prince oversaw the construction of the altar and the central portion of the church. The narthex and the tower were added later, in 1839. Prince Miloš donated two bells, and a third bell was later provided by Prince Aleksandar Karađorđević. During the World War I, all three bells were removed by Central Powers forces, along with the zinc roofing material.

Significant restoration work on the church's iconostasis began in May 1984 and was successfully completed after several months, during which the church also received a large icon of the Holy Trinity along with several other icons. On May 24, 1991, the church's bells were electrified. Further major repairs were undertaken in the summer of 1998.

== See also ==
- List of cathedrals in Serbia
