= Varnava, Serbian Patriarch =

Patriarch of the Serbian Orthodox Church from 1930 to 1937

His Holiness Varnava I
- Archbishop of Peć, Metropolitan of Belgrade and Karlovci, and Serbian Patriarch
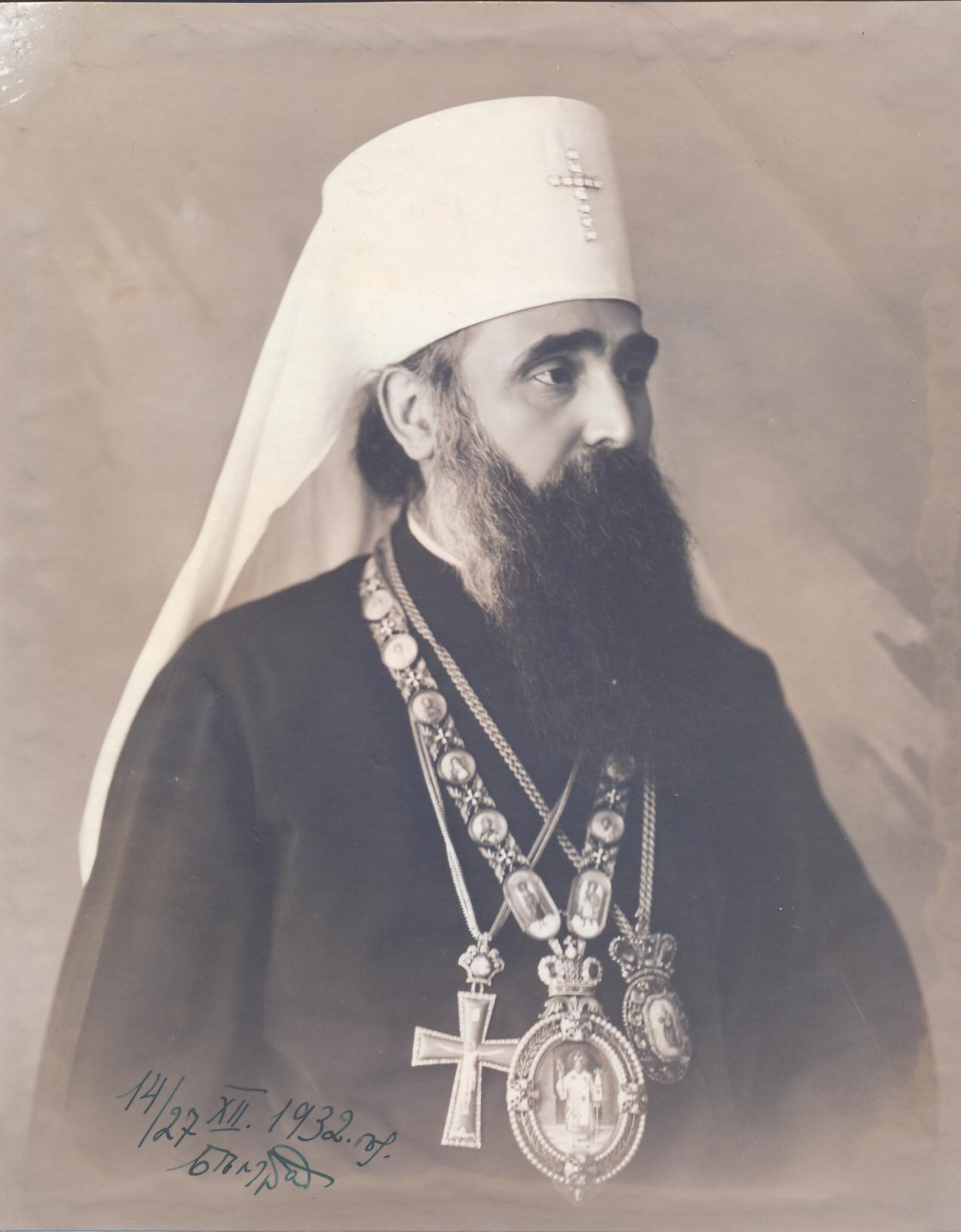
- Church: Serbian Orthodox Church
- See: Belgrade
- Installed: 12 May 1930
- Term ended: 23 July 1937
- Predecessor: Dimitrije
- Successor: Gavrilo V

Orders
- Ordination: 1905
- Consecration: 1910

Personal details
- Born: 11 September 1880 Pljevlja, Ottoman Empire
- Died: 23 July 1937 Belgrade, Kingdom of Yugoslavia

Styles of Serbian Patriarch Varnava I
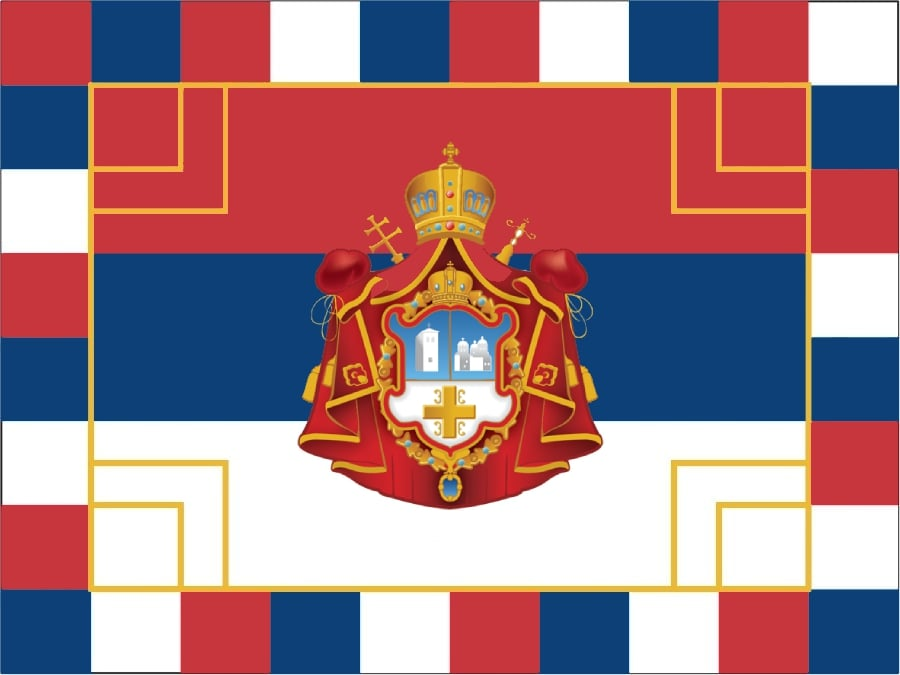
- Reference style: His Holiness
- Spoken style: Your Holiness
- Religious style: Patriarch
- Posthumous style: His Holiness Patriarch Varnava I of Blessed Repose

Varnava Rosić (Serbian: Варнава, English: Barnabas; born Petar Rosić; 11 September 1880 – 23 July 1937) was the 40th Patriarch of the Serbian Orthodox Church, serving from 1930 until his death in 1937.

Varnava was a leading figure during the Concordat crisis, where the Serbian Orthodox episcopate opposed the adoption of a concordat between the Holy See and Yugoslavia.

== Life ==
Varnava was born as Petar Rosić on 29 August 1880 in Pljevlja, then part of the Ottoman Empire. He attended primary school in his hometown. He graduated from theological and teacher training in Prizren in 1900. As a cadet of the Russian Holy Synod, he studied at the Theological Academy in Petrograd and graduated in 1905 with the degree of candidate of theology. He was tonsured on 30 April 1905.

Since Metropolitan Parthenios of Eparchy of Debar and Veles (1907-1913) was frequently absent from his eparchy, serving as a member of the Holy Synod in Constantinople, it was decided that an auxiliary bishop should be appointed for the administration of the eparchy. By that time, Varnava Rosić was serving as a Serbian Orthodox priest in Constantinople. He was chosen and consecrated as bishop on 10 April 1910 in the Patriarchal Church of Saint George.

As an auxiliary bishop serving in the Eparchy of Debar and Veles, he welcomed the liberation of that region from Ottoman rule in 1912 and annexation to the Kingdom of Serbia. Metropolitan Parthenios was finally transferred to another eparchy in 1913, and bishop Varnava was left in charge not only in the Eparchy of Debar and Veles, since the administration of other ecclesiastical territories annexed to the Kingdom of Serbia was also entrusted to him.

During World War I, upon the Bulgarian occupation of southern parts of Kingdom of Serbia in 1915, he had to leave his eparchy, returning after liberation in 1918. In 1920, he was elected Metropolitan of Skopje and served in that eparchy until 1930, when he became a new Serbian Patriarch.

During the office of Varnava, the dioceses of Zagreb and Mukachevo were established. Between 1931 and 1937, the Serbian Orthodox Church consisted of 27 dioceses and a vicariate in Skadar, Albania. Church life was on the move in all regions. Many monasteries and churches were erected, among which the Palace of the Patriarchate and the Vavedenje Monastery, both in Belgrade. The construction of the Church of Saint Sava was also initiated.

Varnava firmly resisted the introduction of legislation giving greater privileges to the Catholic Church not in Yugoslavia in general, but in Serbia in particular (hence Concordat Crisis). He maintained that these would certainly undermine the positions of the Serbian Orthodox Church and other religious organizations in the country. The Holy Synod was also against government pro-Concordat policy. During the crisis, in an interview to German newspaper in 1937, Varnava praised Adolf Hitler for his stance towards the Catholic Church, calling it "an example of decisiveness that Yugoslavia should emulate." He died unexpectedly on 23 July 1937, a few hours after the lower house of Parliament voted to ratify the Concordat, 166 to 128. His death resulted in protests and violent street demonstrations ensued, leading the government to withdraw the new legislation.

An inquiry into his death found traces of poison. It is believed that Patriarch Varnava was deliberately poisoned because of his struggle against Concordat, though his death is still unresolved.

Patriarch Varnava was awarded Order of the White Eagle and a number of other decorations.

He is the great-uncle of world-renowned performance artist Marina Abramović.

== See also ==
- List of heads of the Serbian Orthodox Church
- List of 20th-century religious leaders

Eastern Orthodox Church titles
Preceded by Dimitrije	Serbian Patriarch; 1930–1937	Succeeded by Gavrilo V
Preceded by Vićentije Krdžić	Metropolitan of Skopje; 1920–1930	Succeeded by Josif Cvijović

== Sources ==
- Hoare, Marko Atilla (2024). Serbia: A Modern History. Oxford: Oxford University Press. ISBN 9780197790441.
- Слијепчевић, Ђоко М. (1966). Историја Српске православне цркве. Vol. књ. 2. Минхен: Искра.
- Слијепчевић, Ђоко М. (1986). Историја Српске православне цркве. Vol. књ. 3. Келн: Искра.
- Вуковић, Сава (1996). Српски јерарси од деветог до двадесетог века (Serbian Hierarchs from the 9th to the 20th Century). Београд: Евро.
- Пузовић, Предраг (2013). "Последњи дани патријарха Варнаве" (PDF). Богословље: Часопис Православног богословског факултета у Београду (in Serbian). 72 (2): 241–255.
- Масленникова, Наталья (2009). "Священномученик Варнава, Патриарх сербский". Государство, религия, церковь в России и за рубежом (in Russian) (4): 136–150.
- Хмыров, Никодим (2021). "Роль Сербского патриарха Варнавы в преодолении юрисдикционных разделений Русской Православной Церкви заграницей" (PDF). Христанское чтение (in Russian) (3): 408–428.
