= Eparchy of Žiča =

Diocese of the Serbian Orthodox Church

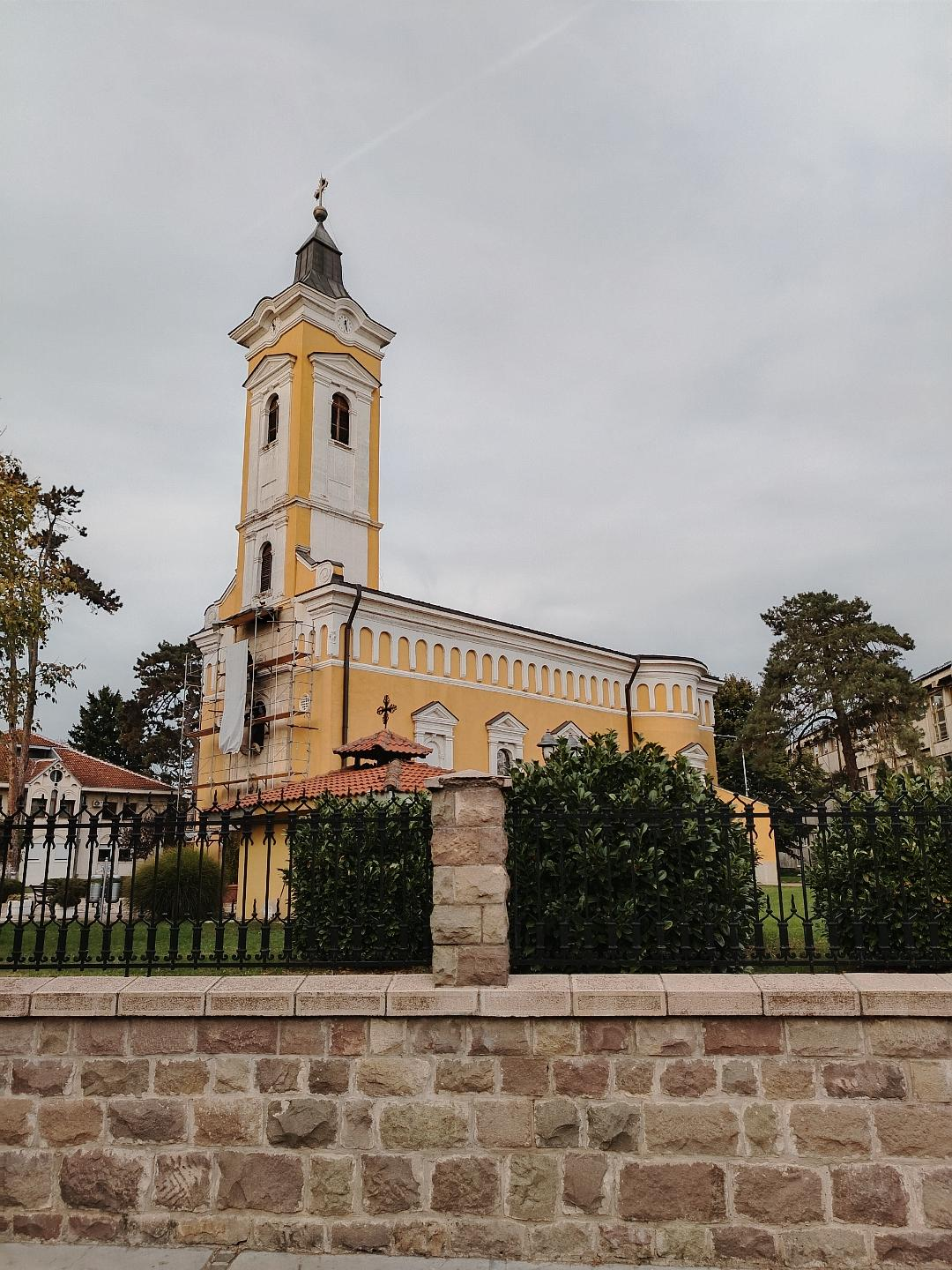
- Holy Trinity Cathedral, Kraljevo

Location
- Territory: southwestern Serbia
- Headquarters: Žiča Monastery, Kraljevo, Serbia

Information
- Denomination: Eastern Orthodox
- Sui iuris church: Serbian Orthodox Church
- Established: 1219
- Cathedral: Holy Trinity Cathedral, Kraljevo
- Language: Church Slavonic, Serbian

Current leadership
- Bishop: Justin Stefanović

Map

Website
- Eparchy of Žiča

Eparchy of Žiča (Serbian: Епархија жичка, romanized: Eparhija žička) is a diocese (eparchy) of the Serbian Orthodox Church, covering central and southwestern Serbia (Moravica District, and parts of Zlatibor and Raška districts).

The episcopal see is located at the Holy Trinity Cathedral, Kraljevo. Its headquarters and bishop's residence are located in the Žiča Monastery.

== History ==
The Eparchy of Žiča is named after the Žiča Monastery that was built around 1208 by Grand Prince Stefan Nemanjić of Serbia, who brought in Greek builders to construct the monastery. In 1219, first Serbian Archbishop Saint Sava chose Žiča to be the Serbian Archiepiscopal seat (Archbishopric of Žiča). Since then, diocese of Žiča was the central eparchy of Serbian Orthodox Church and the monastery church of Žiča was serving for coronations of Serbian kings of the Nemanjić dynasty.

The seat of the Serbian Orthodox Church was moved in 1253 to the Peć Monastery. The collection of church law known as Zakonopravilo was copied at the Žiča Monastery and was for several centuries influential in southeastern Europe and Russia. In the middle of the 15th century, a return of the archiepiscopal seat to Žiča was contemplated due to the Turkish invasion, but the move was not made. In the 16th century, after the Serbian Patriarchate of Peć was renewed, several Metropolitans of Žiča were appointed.

By the beginning of 18th century the territory of this eparchy was incorporated into the Eparchy of Užice and Valjevo. In 1766,Serbian Patriarchate of Peć was abolished, and all of its dioceses that were under Ottoman rule fell under jurisdiction of the Ecumenical Patriarchate of Constantinople. In 1831, autonomous Metropolitanate of Belgrade was recreated, with Eparchy of Užice as one of its dioceses. In 1884, the name of that diocese was officially changed to Eparchy of Žiča.

== List of bishops ==
- Nikifor Maksimović (1831–1853)
- Joanikije Nešković (1854–1873)
- Vikentije Krasojević (1873–1882)
- Kornilije Stanković (1883–1885)
- Nikanor Ružičić (1886–1889)
- Sava Barać (1889–1913)
- Nikolaj Velimirović (1919–1920)
- Jefrem Bojović (1920–1933)
- Nikolaj Velimirović (1936–1941)
- Vikentije Prodanov (administrator) (1941–1947)
- Valerijan Stefanović (administrator) (1947–1949)
- Josif Cvijović (administrator) (1949–1956)
- German Đorić (1956–1958)
- Vasilije Kostić (1961–1978)
- Stefan Boca (1978–2003)
- Hrizostom Stolić (2003–2012)
- Jovan Mladenović (administrator) (2012–2014)
- Justin Stefanović (2014–present)

== Notable monasteries ==
- Žiča
- Studenica
- Gradac
- Vraćevšnica

== Gallery ==
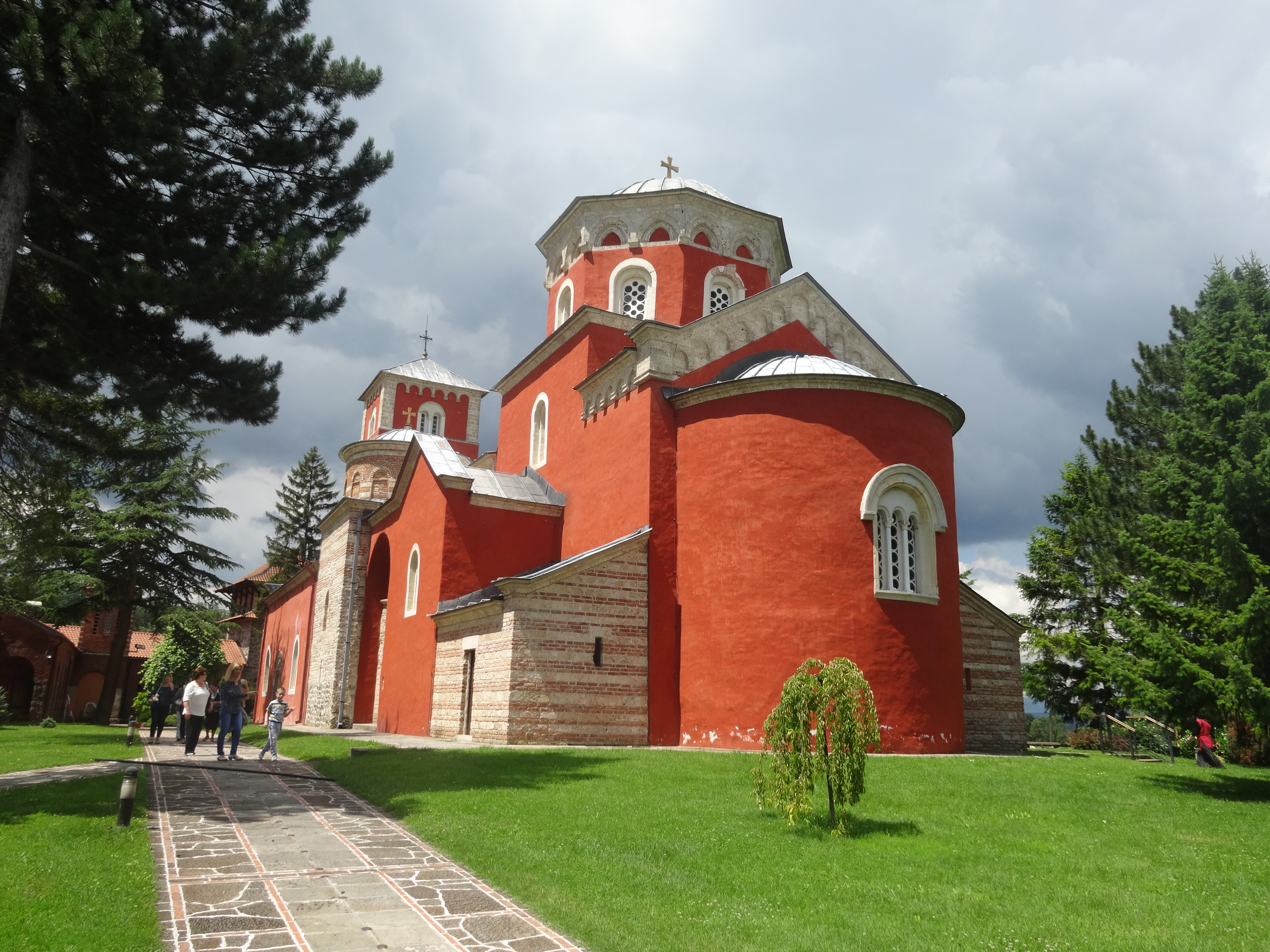
Žiča Monastery

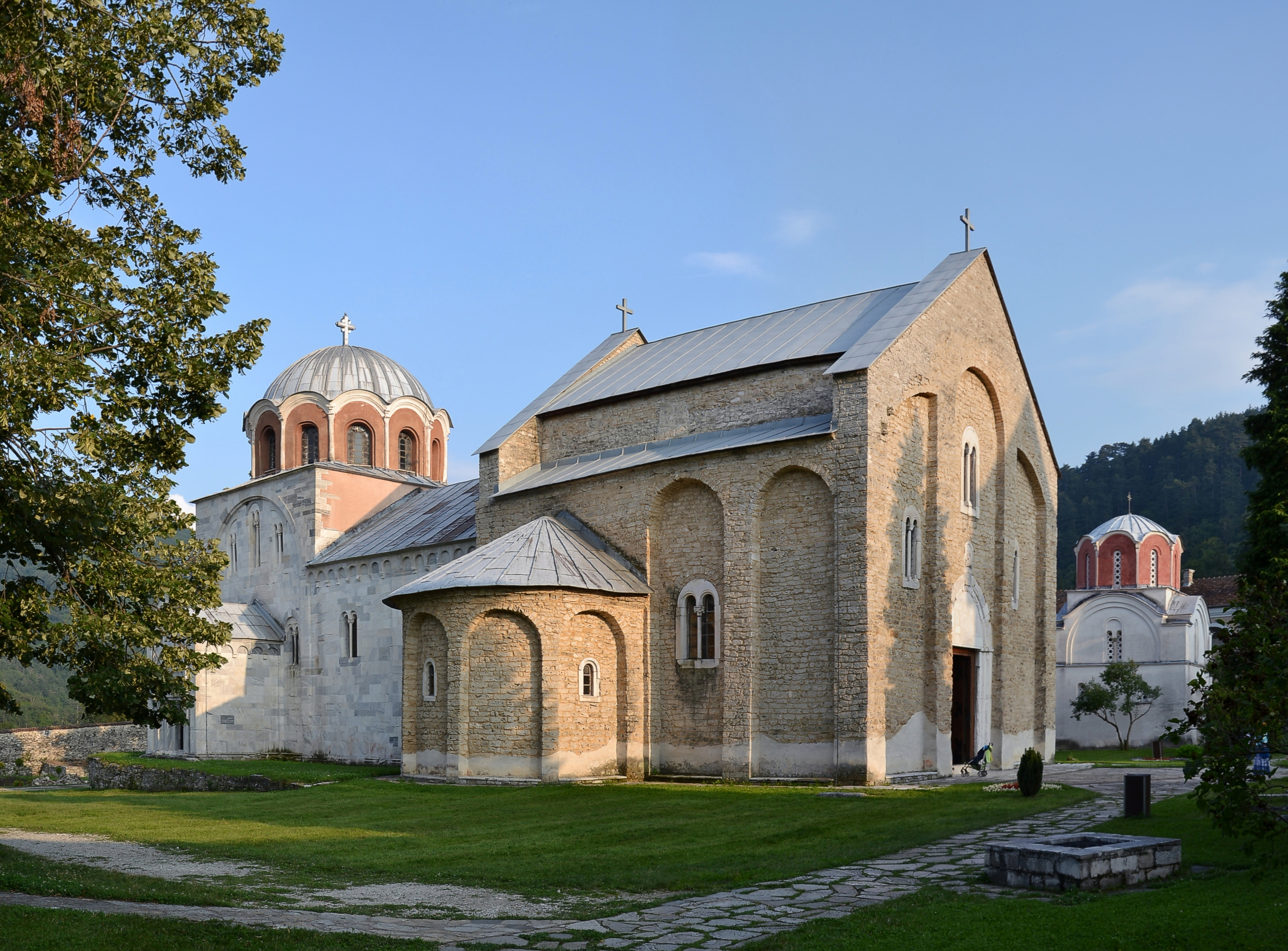
Studenica Monastery

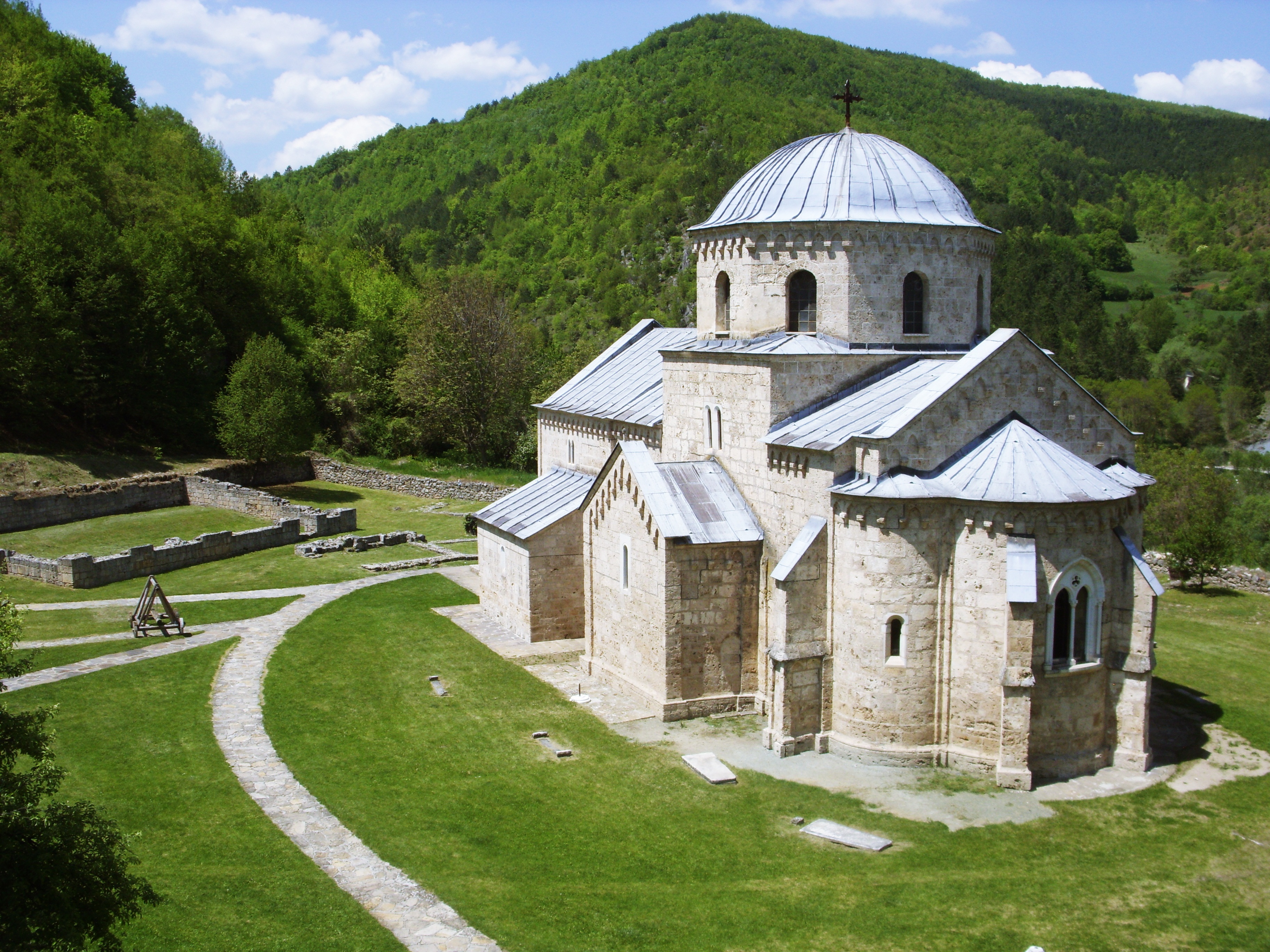
Gradac Monastery

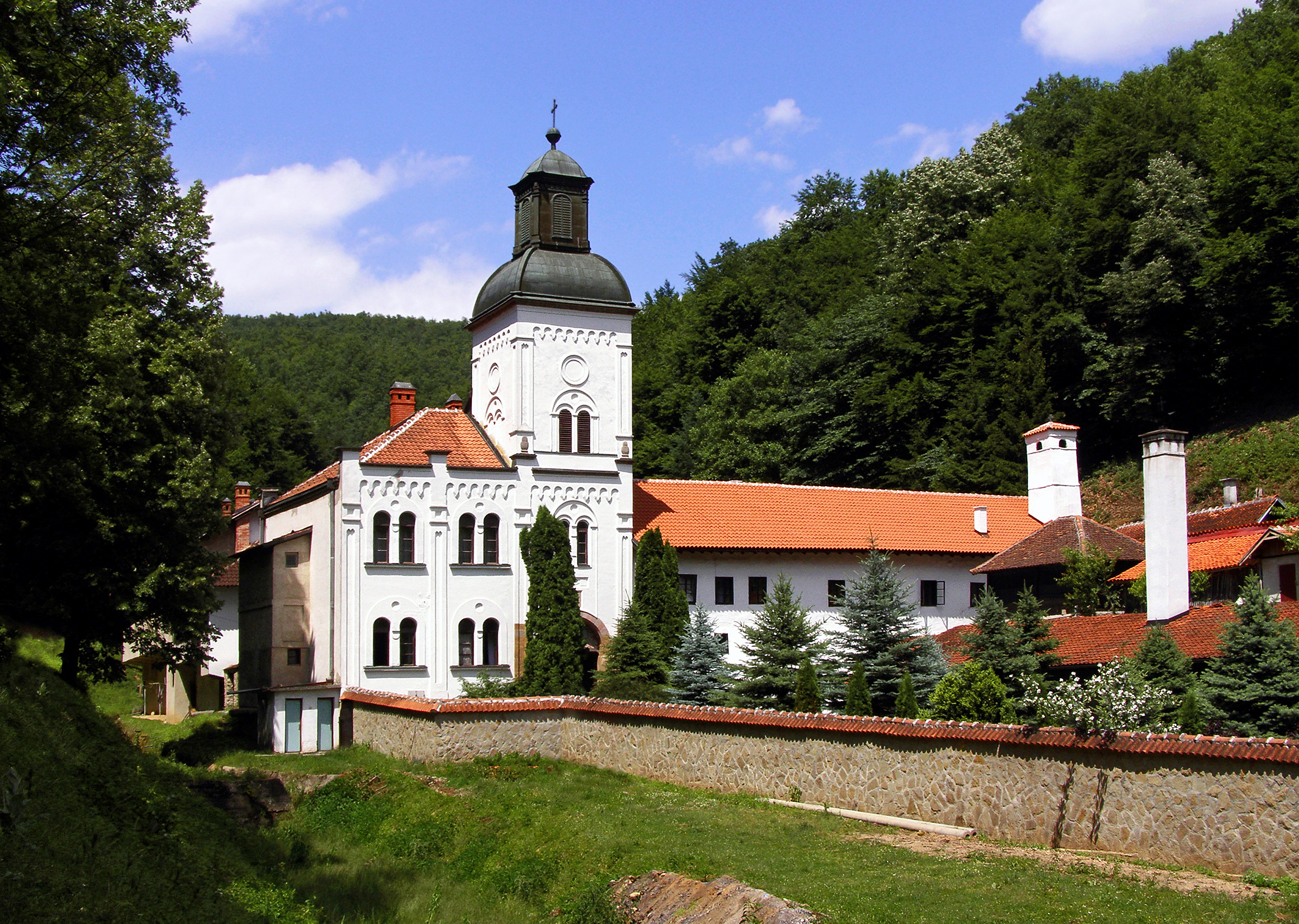
Vraćevšnica Monastery

== See also ==
- Eparchies and metropolitanates of the Serbian Orthodox Church

== Bibliography ==
- Vlasto, Alexis P. (1970). The entry of the Slavs into Christendom. Cambridge University Press. ISBN 9780521074599.
- Јанковић, Марија (1985). Епископије и митрополије Српске цркве у средњем веку (Bishoprics and Metropolitanates of Serbian Church in Middle Ages). Београд: Историјски институт САНУ.
- Вуковић, Сава (1996). Српски јерарси од деветог до двадесетог века (Serbian Hierarchs from the 9th to the 20th Century). Евро, Унирекс, Каленић.
- Popović, Svetlana (2002). "The Serbian Episcopal sees in the thirteenth century (Српска епископска седишта у XIII веку)". Старинар (51: 2001): 171–184.
- Ćirković, Sima (2004). The Serbs. Malden: Blackwell Publishing. ISBN 9781405142915.
