= Gavrilo V, Serbian Patriarch =

Patriarch of the Serbian Orthodox Church from 1938 to 1950

His Holiness Gavrilo V
- Archbishop of Peć, Metropolitan of Belgrade and Karlovci, and Serbian Patriarch
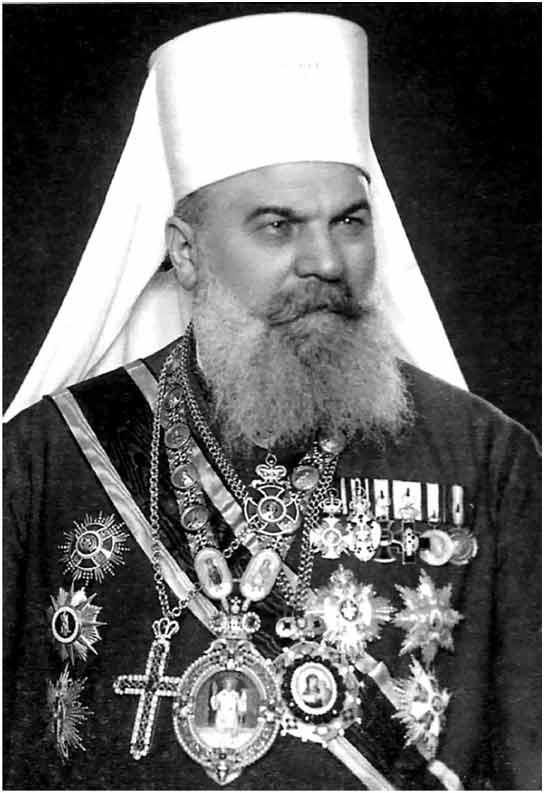
- Church: Serbian Orthodox Church
- See: Belgrade
- Installed: 21 February 1938
- Term ended: 7 May 1950
- Predecessor: Varnava
- Successor: Vikentije II

Orders
- Ordination: 1900
- Consecration: 1911

Personal details
- Born: 17 May 1881 Vrujci, Principality of Montenegro
- Died: 7 May 1950 Belgrade, Yugoslavia

Styles of Serbian Patriarch Gavrilo V
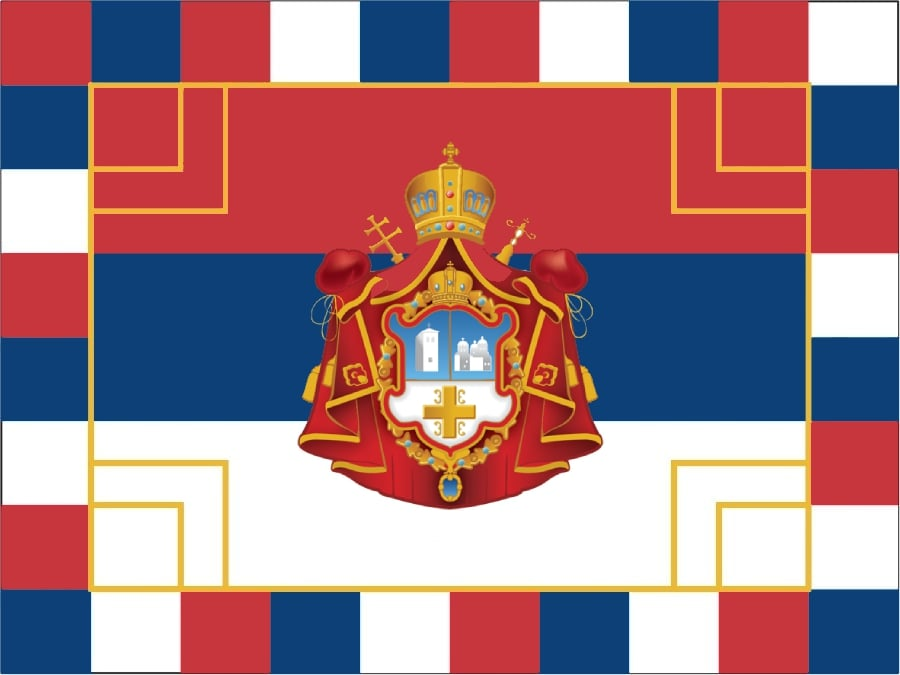
- Reference style: His Holiness
- Spoken style: Your Holiness
- Religious style: Patriarch
- Posthumous style: His Holiness Patriarch Gavrilo V of Blessed Repose

Gavrilo V (Serbian: Гаврило V, English: Gabriel V; born Đorđe Dožić; 17 May 1881 – 7 May 1950) was the 41st Patriarch of the Serbian Orthodox Church, serving from 1938 until his death in 1950.

== Early life ==
Gavrilo V was born as Đorđe Dožić on 17 May 1881 in the village of Vrujci, near Kolašin, then Principality of Montenegro. He finished primary school at the nearby Morača Monastery, as a pupil of his paternal uncle, archimandrite Mihailo. He went to theological schools in Prizren (Seminary of Prizren) and the Prince Islands (Halki Seminary). After that, he finished the theological faculty in Athens (National and Kapodistrian University of Athens). He worked as the secretary of the Hilandar Monastery.

== Bishop of Raška and Prizren ==
After bishop Nićifor Perić of Raška and Prizren withdrew from his office in 1911, due to disagreement with the Serbian diplomacy, the Ecumenical Patriarchate of Constantinople appointed Gavrilo as successor, as the Serbian diplomacy wanted. There was a conflict within the Serbian Church regarding the appointment of Gavrilo; the "Old Serbs" (clergy from Kosovo and Macedonia) wanted their candidate, the previous secretary of the Eparchy of Skopje, monk Vasilije Radenković. While waiting for the Ottoman government approval, the Serbian government changed the decision and ordered through the consuls that Ottoman Serbs request that Radenković be appointed instead. However, Gavrilo ended up being chosen. Meanwhile, Radenković became a founder of the Black Hand conspiracy group.

== Metropolitan of Montenegro ==
After the death of Mitrofan Ban, the Metropolitan of Montenegro and the Littoral, in 1920, Gavrilo was elected as the new metropolitan on 17 November 1920. He stayed at that post until he was chosen to become the Serbian Patriarch on 21 February 1938.

== Serbian Patriarch ==
=== World War II ===
In 1941, as soon as the German forces occupied Yugoslavia, Patriarch Gavrilo was arrested by the Nazis who were looting the gold from the Ostrog Monastery. Ruth Mitchell in her book "The Serbs Choose War", wrote "They took from the old man everything, even his shoes. They left him naked except for his shirt. and over rough roads, over the mountains and through the deep valleys, they made him walk, at the point of a bayonet, two hundred miles, hatless in the burning Balkan sun." He later was confined in the Monastery of Ljubostinja. In May 1943, he was transferred to the Monastery of Vojlovica (near Pančevo) in which he was confined together with Bishop Nikolaj Velimirović until September 1944.

On 15 September 1944, both Patriarch Gavrilo V and Bishop Nikolaj Velimirović were sent to Dachau, which was at that time the main concentration camp for priests arrested by the Nazis. Both Patriarch Gavrilo V and bishop Nikolaj Velimirović were held as special prisoners (Ehrenhäftlinge) imprisoned in the so-called Ehrenbunker (or Prominentenbunker) separated from the work camp area, together with high-ranking Nazi enemy officers and other prominent prisoners. In December 1944 they were transferred from Dachau to Slovenia, together with Milan Nedić, the Serbian collaborationist politician, and German general Hermann Neubacher, as the Nazis attempted to make use of Patriarch Gavrilo V's and bishop Nikolaj Velimirović's authority among the Serbs in order to gain allies in the anti-Communist movements. Contrary to claims of torture and abuse at the camp, evidence that Patriarch Gavrilo V himself was subjected to mistreatment is doubtful. Later, Patriarch Gavrilo V and Bishop Nikolaj Velimirović were moved to Austria, and were finally liberated by the US 36th Infantry Division in Tyrol in 1945.

=== Later years ===
Patriarch Gavrilo V was physically weakened by these vicissitudes and grew to look very old and frail. Soon after, he was taken to England. Both Patriarch Gavrilo V and bishop Nikolaj Velimirović were at Westminster Abbey at the baptism of King Peter II of Yugoslavia's son and heir, Crown Prince Alexander of Yugoslavia. He then returned to what then came to be known as the Socialist Federal Republic of Yugoslavia, while Bishop Nikolaj Velimirović opted to emigrate to the United States.

Patriarch Gavrilo V died on 7 May 1950, aged 68, in Belgrade and was buried in the Cathedral of Saint Archangel Michael.

He was awarded Order of Saint Sava, Order of Prince Danilo I and a number of other decorations.

== See also ==
- List of heads of the Serbian Orthodox Church
- List of 20th-century religious leaders

Eastern Orthodox Church titles
Preceded by Varnava	Serbian Patriarch; 1938–1950	Succeeded by Vikentije II
Preceded by Mitrofan Ban	Metropolitan Bishop of Montenegro and the Littoral; 1920–1938	Succeeded by Joanikije Lipovac
Preceded by Nićifor Perić	Bishop of Raška and Prizren; 1912–1920	Succeeded by Mihajlo Šiljak

== Sources and further reading ==
- Slijepčević, Djoko M. (1966). Историја Српске православне цркве. Vol. књ. 2. Минхен: Искра.
- Slijepčević, Djoko M. (1986). Историја Српске православне цркве. Vol. књ. 3. Келн: Искра.
- Vuković, Sava (1996). Српски јерарси од деветог до двадесетог века (Serbian Hierarchs from the 9th to the 20th Century). Београд: Евро.
- Byford, Jovan (2008). Denial and Repression of Antisemitism: Post-communist Remembrance of the Serbian Bishop Nikolaj Velimirovic. Central European University Press. ISBN 9789639776159.
- Vuković, Sava (2001). "Српски патријарси двадесетог века: Гаврило V (Дожић)". Даница (8). Београд: Вукова задужбина: 476–480.
- Dušan N Štrbac; Savez udruženja pravoslavnog sveštenstva FNR Jugoslavije (1960). Spomenica pravoslavnih sveštenika, žrtava fašističkog terora i palih u narodnooslobodilačkoj borbi. Savez udruženja pravoslavnog sveštenstva FNRJ.
- Ljubomir Durković-Jakšić (1980). Učešće patrijarha Gavrila i Srpske pravoslavne crkve u događajima ispred i za vreme 27. marta 1941. i njihovo stradanje u toku rata: povodom 30-godišnice od smrti patrijarha Gavrila. Sveti arhijerejski sinod Srpske pravoslavne crkve.
- Radić, Radmila (1998). Hilandar u državnoj politici kraljevine Srbije i Jugoslavije 1896-1970. Službeni list SRJ. ISBN 9788635504018.
