= Vavedenje Monastery =

Monastery in Serbia

Coordinates: 44°47′26″N 20°26′38″E

- Манастир Ваведење
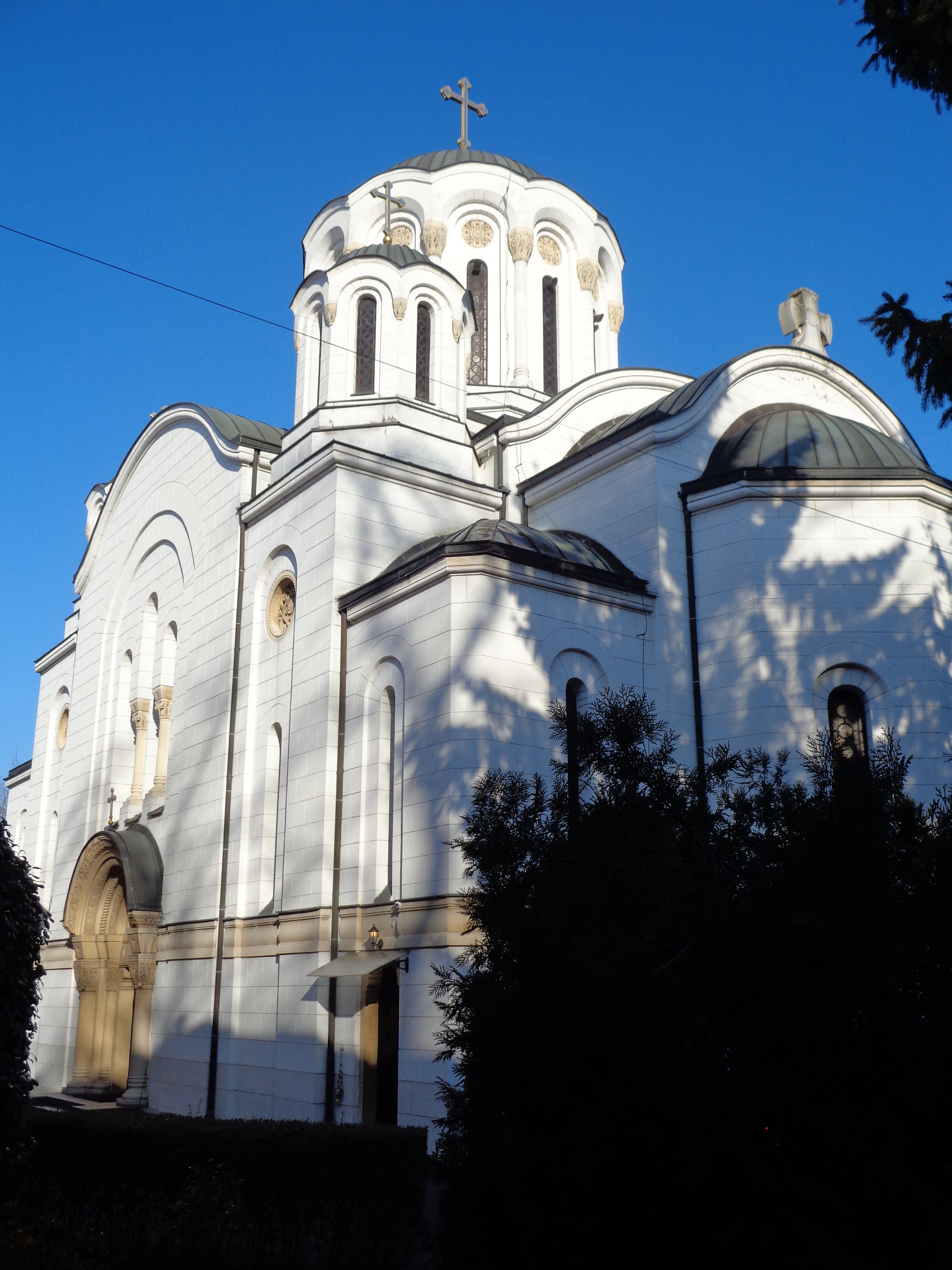
- Vavedenje Monastery
- Denomination: Serbian Orthodox

Architecture
- Architectural type: Serbo-Byzantine architecture
- Style: Serbo-Byzantine style

Vavedenje Monastery (Serbian Cyrillic: Манастир Ваведење) is a Serbian Orthodox monastery located in Senjak, an urban settlement in the municipality of Savski Venac in Belgrade. The foundations of the temple were consecrated on August 11, 1935. It was built and consecrated on October 25, 1936 as the metochion of Kuveždin Monastery in Srem. The legend of the construction of the church is related to the dream of the founder Persida Milenković, who fell asleep three times, that the monastery should be built on that very spot. The boarding house, built at the same time as the church, was said to be used as a boarding school for the education of Orthodox charitable sisters, educators and caregivers before its completion.

In 1939, there were ten nuns in the monastery doing embroidery work, such as making veils for the table of honor and curtains for the patriarchal chapel.

The Holy Confessor Dositej Vasić was buried in the gate and in 2009 he was transferred to the ark of the monastery temple. It represents an immovable cultural property as a cultural monument. Serbian archbishops Damaskin Grdanički, Arsenije Bradvarević, Josif Cvijović and Danilo Krstić were also buried in the monastery.

The abbots of the Vavedenja monastery were: Melanija Krivokućanin (1938—1942), Angelina Gračeva (1942—1970), Agnija Dmitrović (1980—2001), Anastasija Savković (2001—2019), Teodora Vasić (2020—present).

The priests in the monastery are Archpriest Fr. Milovan Glogovac and Fr. Milosav Radojevic. In the residence of the Vavedenja monastery, there is a chapel – a winter church dedicated to St. Nicholas the Wonderworker. In the chapel there are three arks with particles of the relics of the saints. There is also a pillow on which the head of St. Petka rested in the ark in Iasi, which the sisters received as a gift from a monk from Iasi. The monastery treasury keeps old manuscripts and printed liturgical books, as well as icons that Russian nuns brought with them to Serbia after the October coup. On the territory of the monastery complex, there are three pits in which the bodies of those killed and shot on St. Dmitrov's Day in 1944 and those who died on Easter 1944 from the Allied bombing are.

== Architecture ==
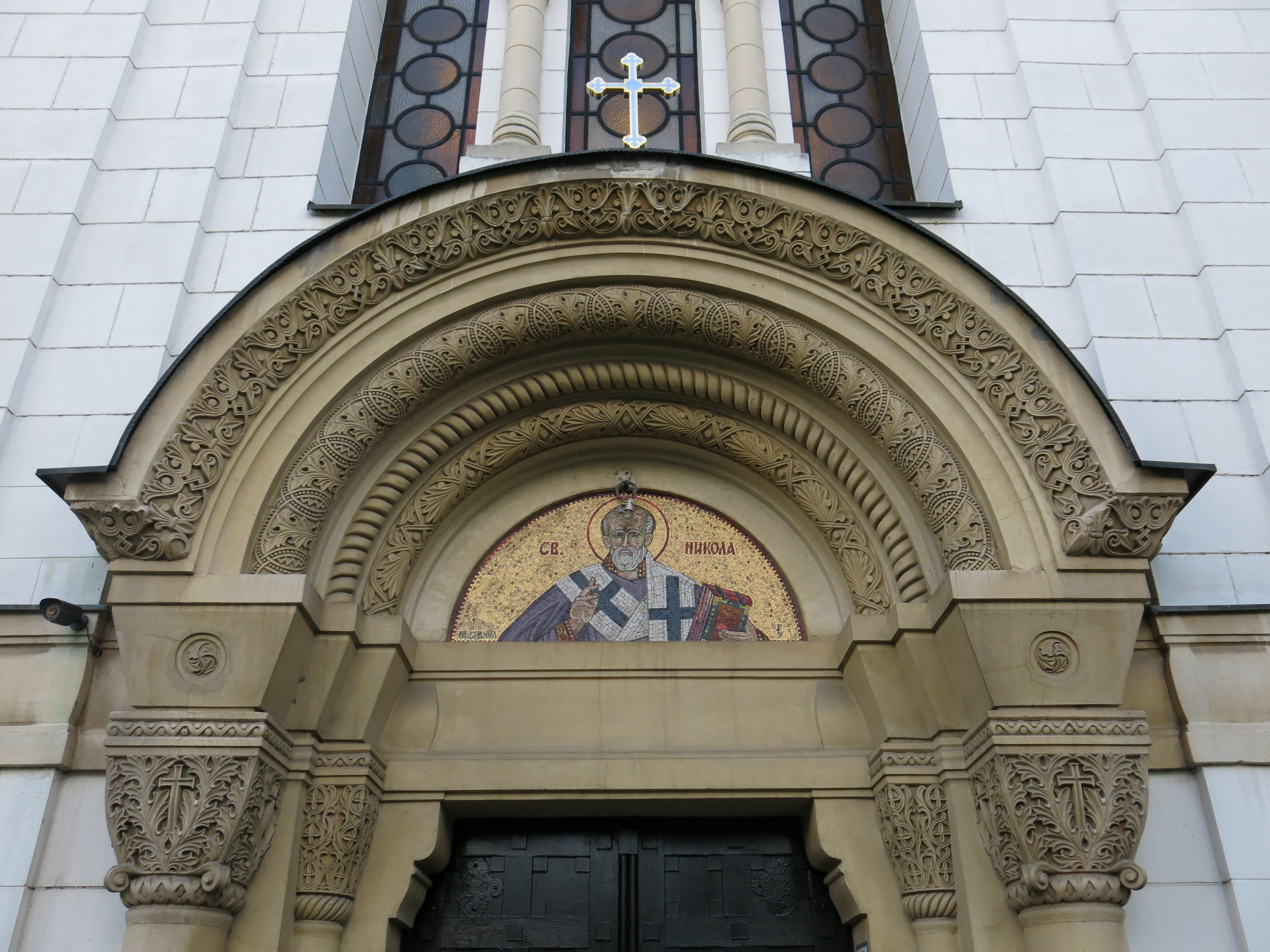
Detail of the entrance of the church of the monastery

The monastery's architectural structure was designed by Petra Popović.

The base of the church is in the shape of an inscribed cross, with a central dome at the intersection and four smaller domes between the arms of the cross. Wooden stasis, choir counter, backrests, portals for kissing icons, as well as a ciborium with a five-domed canopy in the nave, are all made in the same decorative system of shallow relief of the predominant floral motifs.

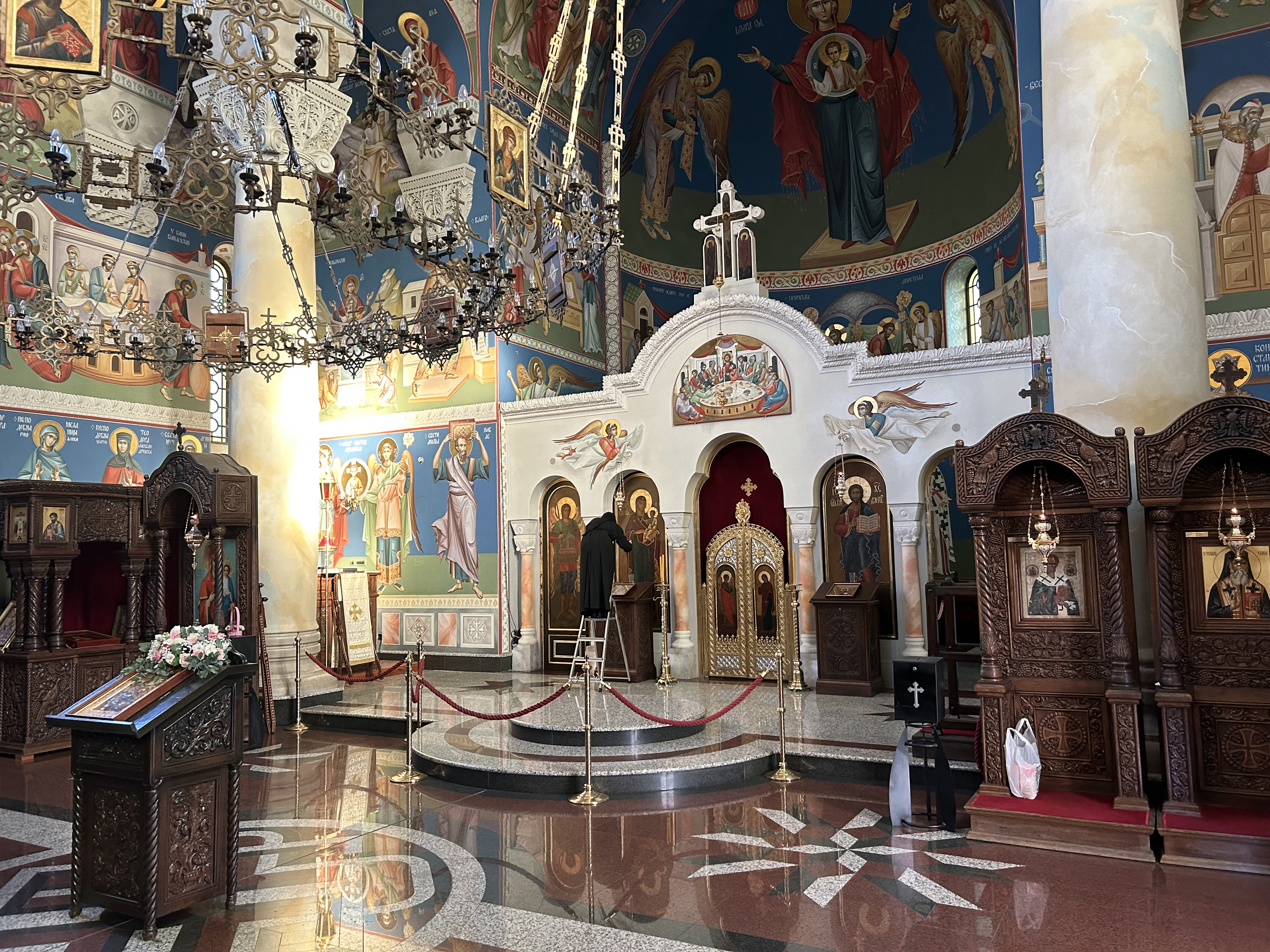
Monastery interior

Episcopal and royal wooden thrones are simple decorations. The central, domed, part of the nave is decorated with a metal chandelier, the work of sculptor Slobodan Rekalić, and the icons on the chandelier are the work of painter Ivana Pecin.

== See also ==
- List of Serbian Orthodox monasteries
