= Eparchy of Debar and Kičevo =

Church diocese in North Macedonia

Eparchy of Debar and Kičevo Епархија дебарско-кичевска

Location
- Territory: Western region of the North Macedonia
- Headquarters: Debar; North Macedonia

Information
- Denomination: Eastern Orthodox
- Sui iuris church: Serbian Orthodox Church – autonomous Orthodox Ohrid Archbishopric
- Established: 2003
- Dissolved: 2023
- Language: Church Slavonic

Leadership
- Bishop: administrator Joakim Jovčevski (2005–2023)

Website
- Bishopric of Debar and Kičevo

Eparchies of Serbian Orthodox Church, including Orthodox Ohrid Archbishopric

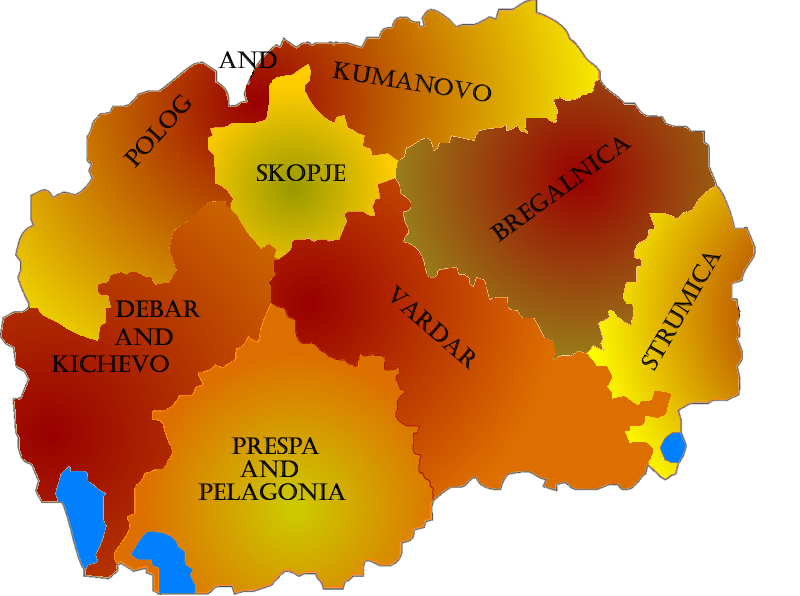
Map of the seven eparchies of Orthodox Ohrid Archbishopric in North Macedonia

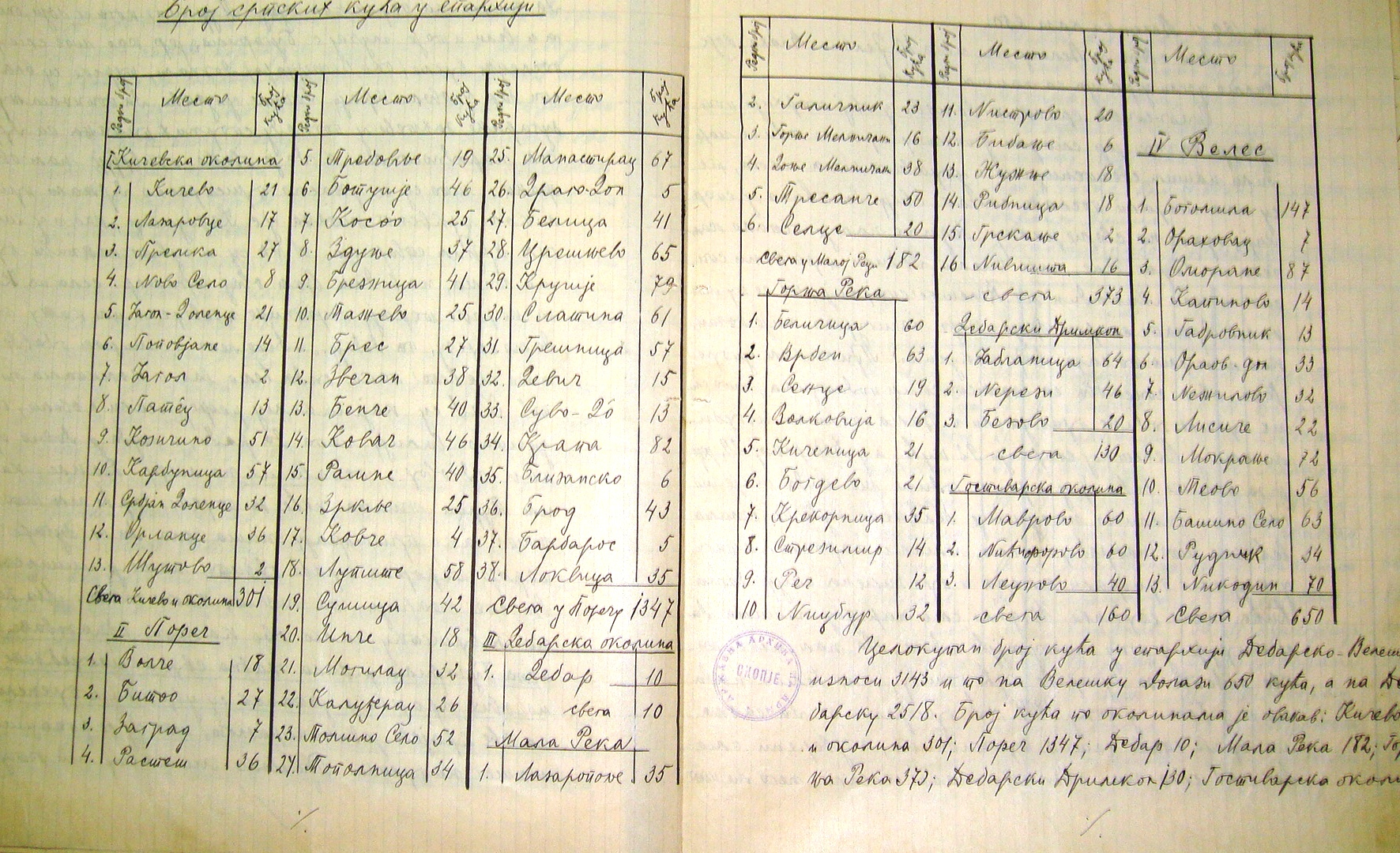
Census of Serbian parishioners in the Eparchy - Official report from Metropolitan Polycarpos, 25 February 1904.

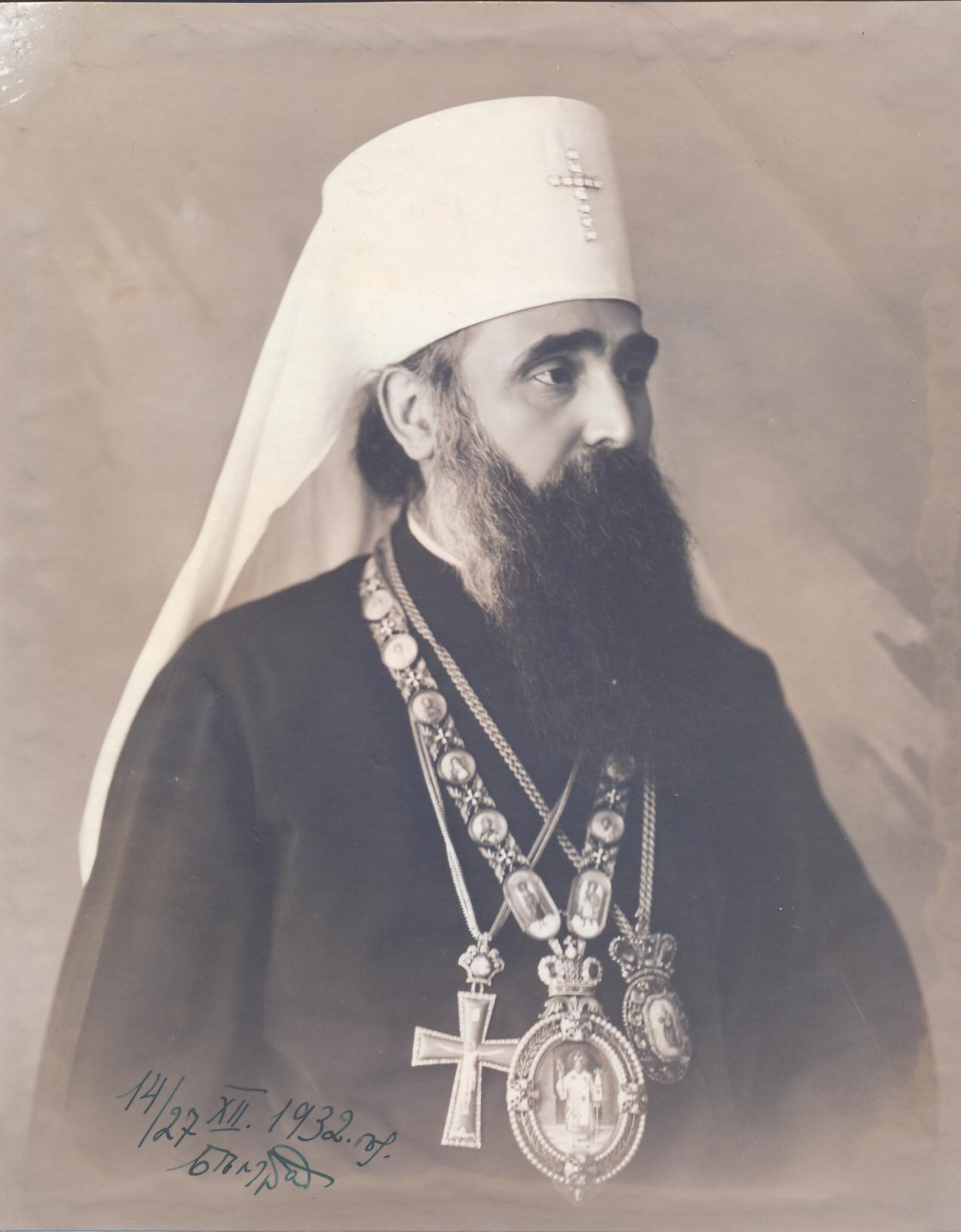
Serbian Patriarch Varnava Rosić (1930-1937), who previously served as auxiliary bishop in the Eparchy (1910-1920)

Eparchy of Debar and Kičevo (Епархија дебарско-кичевска) was an Eastern Orthodox eparchy (diocese) of the Orthodox Ohrid Archbishopric, an autonomous and canonical branch of the Serbian Orthodox Church in North Macedonia. Its historical seat is in the city of Debar. During its existence, the eparchy was under administration of Bishop Joakim Jovčevski of Polog and Kumanovo.

Eparchy of Debar and Kičevo existed previously (before 1920) as part of the Ecumenical Patriarchate of Constantinople. After its territory was acquired by the Serbian Orthodox Church in 1920, the eparchy was abolished. In 1968, Diocese of Debar and Kičevo was re-established as part of the then-unrecognized Macedonian Orthodox Church. This move was not recognized by the Orthodox community. Serbian Church re-established the Eparchy of Debar and Kičevo in 2005 as part of the newly formed Orthodox Ohrid Archbishopric.

In 2022, the dispute between the Serbian and Macedonian churches was resolved. The whole Ohrid Archbishopric was abolished in 2023 and merged in the Macedonian Orthodox Church.

== History ==
From 1018 to 1283, Eparchy of Debar and neighboring region of Kičevo were under ecclesiastical jurisdiction of Eastern Orthodox Archbishopric of Ohrid. In 1107, archbishop Theophylact of Ohrid reported that bishop of Debar had to flee because of war between Byzantines and Normans that ended with the Treaty of Devol. In 1283, Byzantine rule ended. Territories of Debar and Kičevo were incorporated into the medieval Kingdom of Serbia and placed under the jurisdiction of Serbian Orthodox Church. In 1395–1396, entire region was conquered by Ottoman Turks, and subsequently placed again under the jurisdiction of Archbishopric of Ohrid. Under Ottoman rule, the region was organized as Sanjak of Debar.

In 1557, when Serbian Patriarchate of Peć was restored, Eparchy of Debar remained under ecclesiastical jurisdiction of Archbishops of Ohrid. After the suppression of Serbian Patriarchate (1766) and Archbishopric of Ohrid (1767), all of their eparchies came under direct jurisdiction of Ecumenical Patriarchate of Constantinople. Since then, Bishops of Dabar were appointed from Constantinople and they were granted the honorary title of Metropolitan.

In 1873, Eparchy of Debar was merged with Eparchy of Veles into Eparchy of Debar and Veles. In 1910, during the tenure of metropolitan Parthenios (1907-1913), Patriarchal Syond in Constantinople appointed Serbian Archimandrite Varnava Rosić (future Serbian Patriarch) as auxiliary bishop in the eparchy, with title "Bishop of Glavinica".

Ottoman rule ended in 1912, and the region was incorporated into Kingdom of Serbia. Metropolitan Parthenios left for Greece and bishop Varnava took over the administration of the eparchy. In 1920, entire region was officially transferred to the jurisdiction of the reunited Serbian Orthodox Church. At the same time, local eparchies were reorganized, and the Eparchy of Debar and Veles was divided, Veles and Kičevo being incorporated into Metropolitanate of Skopje, while the region of Debar was incorporated into the Eparchy of Ohrid which was later merged with the Eparchy of Bitola into the "Eparchy of Ohrid and Bitola" in 1931.

In 1959, Serbian Orthodox Church granted autonomy to eparchies in North Macedonia. After the failed negotiations and unilateral (and uncanonical) proclamation of autocephaly of Macedonian Orthodox Church in 1967, ecclesiastical order was disrupted. Since Republic of Macedonia proclaimed independence in 1992, Serbian Orthodox Church decided to place all eparchies in Macedonia under special administration. In 1993, auxiliary bishop Jovan Mladenović of Tetovo was appointed administrator of all eparchies in North Macedonia. Next year, he was transferred to another duty and administration was given to Bishop Pahomije Gačić of Vranje.

In 2005, reorganized Eparchy of Debar and Kičevo was placed under the administration of Joakim Jovčevski, Bishop of Polog and Kumanovo.

During the regular session of the Council of Bishops of SOC in May 2023, it was decided that the Orthodox Ohrid Archbishopric is now part of the MOC. Its bishops were given dispensation from the jurisdiction of SOC and were directed to join the MOC jurisdiction.

== Bishops ==
Metropolitans of Debar and Veles (Δεβρών και Βελισσού) under jurisdiction of Ecumenical Patriarchate of Constantinople (1873-1920)

Name	Service
Anthimos I of Debar and Veles	1873 - 1876
Kallinikos of Debar and Veles	1876 - 1880
Anthimos I of Debar and Veles (again)	1880 - 1887
Methodios of Debar and Veles	1887 - 1891
Anthimos II of Debar and Veles	1891 - 1900
Polycarpos of Debar and Veles	1900 - 1907
Parthenios of Debar and Veles	1907 - 1913

== See also ==
- Orthodox Ohrid Archbishopric
- Archbishop Jovan VI of Ohrid
- Eparchy of Polog and Kumanovo
- List of eparchies of the Serbian Orthodox Church
- John of Debar

== Sources ==
- Slijepčević, Đoko M. (1958). The Macedonian Question: The Struggle for Southern Serbia. Chicago: The American Institute for Balkan Affairs.
- Fine, John Van Antwerp Jr. (1994). The Late Medieval Balkans: A Critical Survey from the Late Twelfth Century to the Ottoman Conquest. The University of Michigan Press. ISBN 0472082604.
- Ćirković, Sima (2004). The Serbs. Malden: Blackwell Publishing. ISBN 9781405142915.
- Kiminas, Demetrius (2009). The Ecumenical Patriarchate: A History of Its Metropolitanates with Annotated Hierarch Catalogs. Wildside Press LLC. ISBN 9781434458766.
- Sotirović, Vladislav B. (2011). "The Serbian Patriarchate of Peć in the Ottoman Empire: The First Phase (1557–94)". Serbian Studies: Journal of the North American Society for Serbian Studies. 25 (2): 143–169. doi:10.1353/ser.2011.0038. S2CID 143629322.
