= Eparchy of Polog and Kumanovo =

Eparchy of Polog and Kumanovo Епархија полошко-кумановска

Location
- Territory: Bogovinje, Brvenica, Gostivar, Jegunovce, Mavrovo and Rostuša, Tearce, Tetovo, Vrapčište, Želino, Kumanovo, Kratovo, Kriva Palanka, Rankovce, Lipkovo, Staro Nagoričane
- Headquarters: Kumanovo, North Macedonia

Information
- Denomination: Eastern Orthodox
- Sui iuris church: Serbian Orthodox Church – autonomous Orthodox Ohrid Archbishopric
- Established: 2003
- Dissolved: 2023
- Language: Church Slavonic

Leadership
- Bishop: Joakim Jovčevski (2004–present)

Website
- Bishopric of Polog and Kumanovo

Eparchies of Serbian Orthodox Church, including Orthodox Ohrid Archbishopric

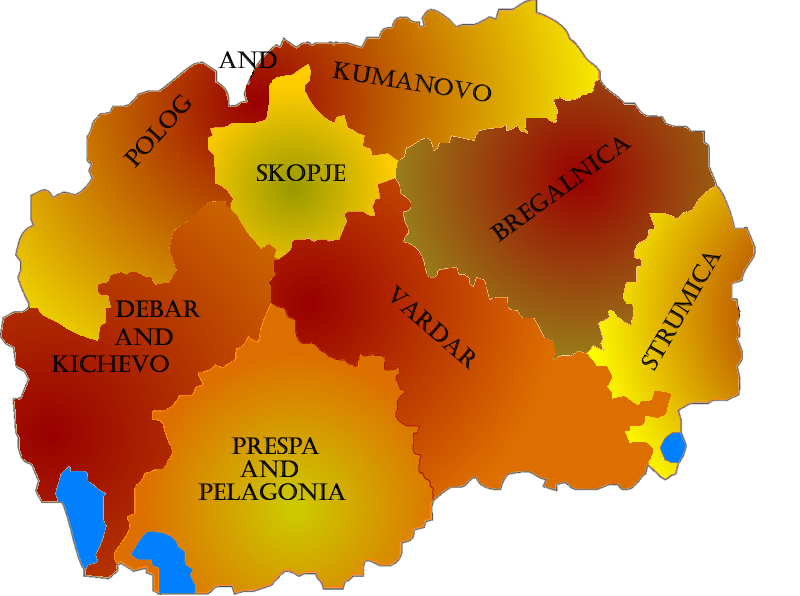
Map of the seven eparchies of Orthodox Ohrid Archbishopric in North Macedonia

Eparchy of Polog and Kumanovo (Serbian: Епархија полошко-кумановска) was an Eastern Orthodox Eparchy of the Orthodox Ohrid Archbishopric, an autonomous and canonical branch of the Serbian Orthodox Church in North Macedonia. Its seat is in Kumanovo. During all of its existence, the Bishop of Polog and Kumanovo was Joakim Jovčevski. It was established in 2003 when the Orthodox Ohrid Archbishopric was formed as part of the Serbian Church. It was abolished in 2023 and merged into the Macedonian Orthodox Church.

== History ==
From 1018 to 1282, regions of Polog and Kumanovo were under ecclesiastical jurisdiction of Archbishopric of Ohrid. In 1282, regions were incorporated into Kingdom of Serbia and placed under the jurisdiction of Serbian Orthodox Church. In 1395, entire region was conquered by Ottoman Turks and placed again under the jurisdiction of Archbishopric of Ohrid.

In 1557, when Serbian Patriarchate of Peć was restored, regions were returned under its ecclesiastical jurisdiction. Since 1766, when Serbian Patriarchate was abolished, regions came under the jurisdiction of Patriarchate of Constantinople as part of the Eparchy of Skopje. In 1920 entire region was again returned to the jurisdiction of Serbian Orthodox Church.

In 1959, Serbian Orthodox Church granted autonomy to eparchies in Republic of Macedonia. After the unilateral and uncanonical proclamation of autocephaly of Macedonian Orthodox Church in 1967, ecclesiastical order was disrupted. Since Republic of Macedonia proclaimed independence in 1992, Serbian Orthodox Church decided to place all eparchies in Macedonia under special administration. In 1993, auxiliary bishop Jovan Mladenović of Tetovo (in the region of Polog) was appointed administrator of all eparchies in the Republic of Macedonia. Next year, he was transferred to another duty and administration of eparchies in Macedonia was given to Bishop Pahomije Gačić of Vranje. In 2003, Eparchy of Polog and Kumanovo was placed under the administration of Joakim Jovčevski, auxiliary Bishop of Velika. In 2004, he was elected as diocesan Bishop of Polog and Kumanovo.

During the regular session of the Council of Bishops of the Serbian Orthodox Church in May 2023, it was decided that the Orthodox Ohrid Archbishopric is now part of the MOC. Its bishops were given dispensation from the jurisdiction of SOC and were directed to join the Macedonian Orthodox Church jurisdiction.

== See also ==
- Eparchy of Debar and Kičevo
- Orthodox Ohrid Archbishopric
- Archbishop Jovan VI of Ohrid

== Sources ==
- Slijepčević, Đoko M. (1958). The Macedonian Question: The Struggle for Southern Serbia. Chicago: The American Institute for Balkan Affairs.
- Ćirković, Sima (2004). The Serbs. Malden: Blackwell Publishing. ISBN 9781405142915.
- Kiminas, Demetrius (2009). The Ecumenical Patriarchate: A History of Its Metropolitanates with Annotated Hierarch Catalogs. Wildside Press LLC. ISBN 9781434458766.
- Sotirović, Vladislav B. (2011). "The Serbian Patriarchate of Peć in the Ottoman Empire: The First Phase (1557–94)". Serbian Studies: Journal of the North American Society for Serbian Studies. 25 (2): 143–169. doi:10.1353/ser.2011.0038. S2CID 143629322.
