= Metropolitanate of Skopje =

Eastern Orthodox eparchy in North Macedonia

Metropolitanate of Skopje Митрополија скопска Μητρόπολις Σκόπιάς

Location
- Territory: Region of Skopje
- Headquarters: Skopje, North Macedonia

Information
- Denomination: Eastern Orthodox
- Sui iuris church: Serbian Orthodox Church – autonomous Orthodox Ohrid Archbishopric
- Established: 2002
- Dissolved: 2023
- Language: Church Slavonic

Leadership
- Bishop: Jovan Vraniškovski (2002–2023)

Website
- Metropolitanate of Skopje

Eparchies of Serbian Orthodox Church, including Orthodox Ohrid Archbishopric

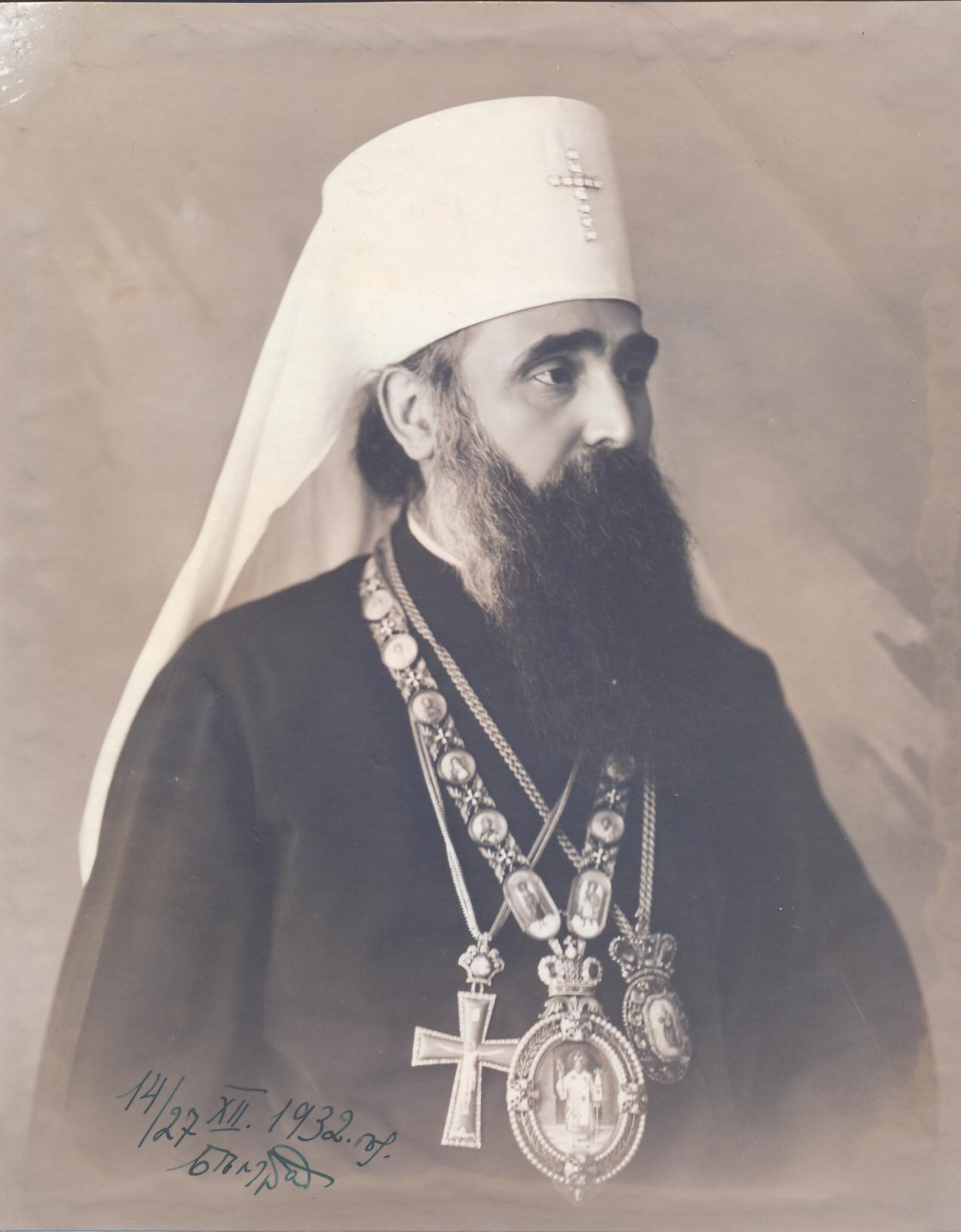
Serbian Patriarch Varnava Rosić (1930–1937), who previously was Metropolitan of Skopje from 1920 to 1930

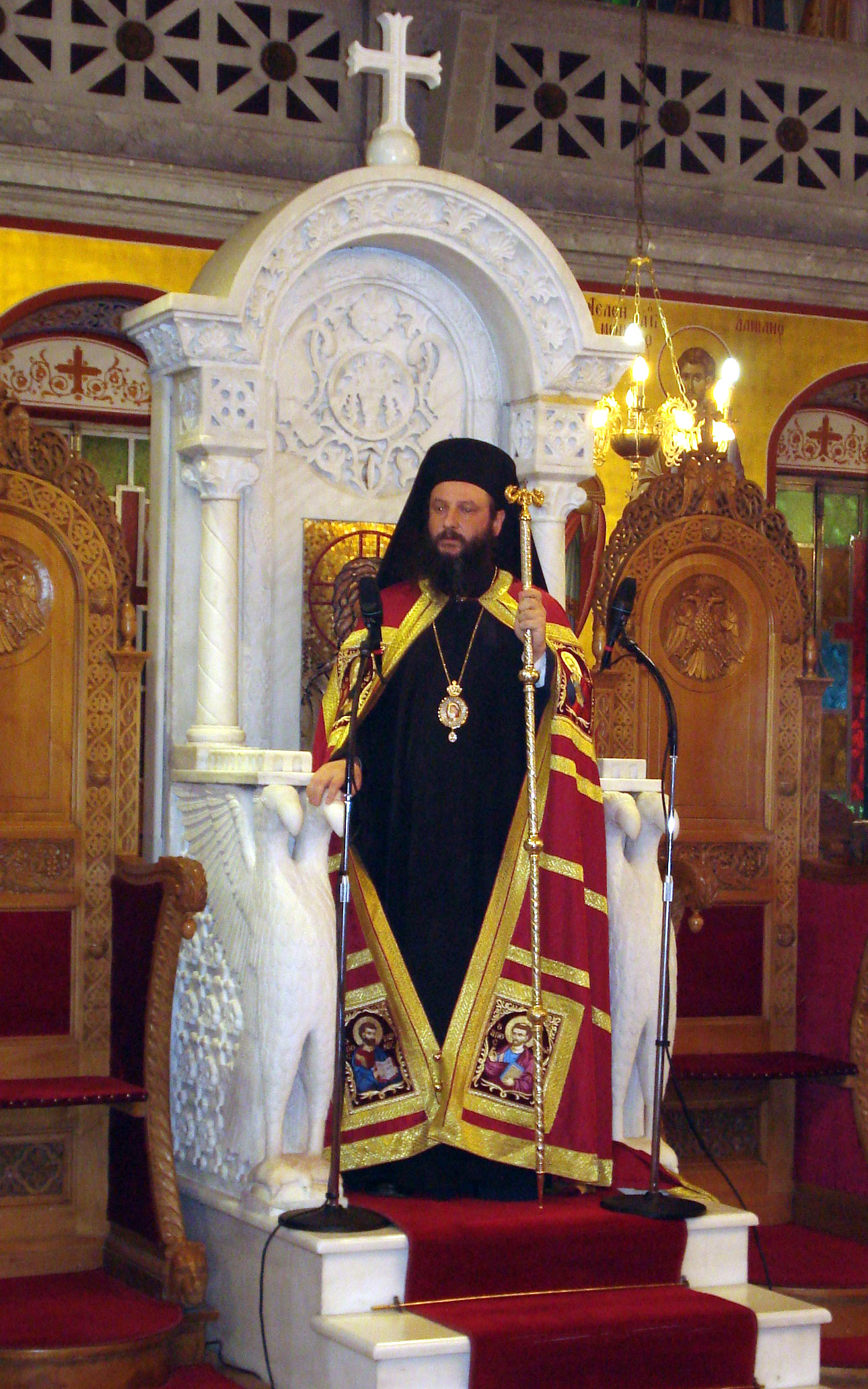
Archbishop Jovan Vraniškovski of Ohrid and Metropolitan of Skopje

The Metropolitanate of Skopje (Serbian: Митрополија скопска; Greek: Μητρόπολις Σκόπιάς) was an Eastern Orthodox eparchy, under the jurisdiction of the Orthodox Ohrid Archbishopric, an autonomous and canonical branch of the Serbian Orthodox Church in North Macedonia. Its seat was in Skopje. It was a metropolitan diocese of the Orthodox Ohrid Archbishopric, headed by Archbishop Jovan (Vraniškovski) of Ohrid, who was also styled Metropolitan of Skopje. In 2022, the dispute between the Serbian and Macedonian churches was resolved. The whole Ohrid Archbishopric was abolished in 2023 and merged in the Macedonian Orthodox Church.

== History ==
The see of Skopje is one of the oldest sees in the region. The modern name of the city of Skopje was derived from the name of its predecessor, the ancient Roman city of Scupi. It was one of the most important cities in the Roman province of Moesia Superior and since the end of the 3rd century the capital of its successor province of Dardania. The ancient Bishopric of Scupi was situated near the modern town of Skopje, where the remains of an episcopal basilica have been found and excavated. The exact date of the foundation of the Bishopric of Scupi is not known, but it already existed by the beginning of the 4th century. In that time, the bishop of ancient Scupi was also the Metropolitan of Dardania.

After the division of the Roman Empire in 395, the city of Scupi, with the rest of Dardania, remained part of the Eastern Roman or Byzantine Empire. Up to the beginning of the 6th century, the episcopal see of Scupi was already under supreme ecclesiastical jurisdiction of the Archbishopric of Thessaloniki. In 535, by the decree of emperor Justinian I (527–565), it was transferred to newly created Archbishopric of Justiniana Prima. Byzantine rule in that region finally collapsed at the beginning of the 7th century, and the church life was later renewed after the Christianization of Serbs.

After the successful Byzantine campaigns of 1018 and the reestablishment of imperial rule in Bulgarian and Serbian lands, by the order of emperor Basil II an autonomous Archbishopric of Ohrid was created in 1019, under the supreme ecclesiastical jurisdiction of the Ecumenical Patriarchate of Constantinople. Imperial charters of 1019 and 1020 mention the Bishopric of Skopje among eparchies under the jurisdiction of the Archbishopric of Ohrid. In 1282, the region of Skopje was incorporated into the Kingdom of Serbia, and the see of Skopje was placed under the jurisdiction of the Serbian Orthodox Church. In 1346, the Bishop of Skopje was granted the honorary title of Metropolitan, on the occasion of the proclamation of the Serbian Patriarchate. In 1392, the city was conquered by Ottoman Turks, and soon after the see was returned under the jurisdiction of the Archbishopric of Ohrid.

In 1557, when the Serbian Patriarchate of Peć was restored, the Metropolitanate of Skopje was returned under its ecclesiastical jurisdiction. The Epachy of Skopje was one of the most important sees of the Serbian Patriarchate. In 1711, Metropolitan Atanasije I of Skopje was elected Serbian Patriarch. In 1747, Metropolitan Atanasije II of Skopje was also elected Serbian Patriarch. Since 1766, when the Serbian Patriarchate was abolished, the Eparchy of Skopje came under the jurisdiction of the Ecumenical Patriarchate of Constantinople. In 1912, the Serbian army liberated Skopje from Ottoman rule. Soon after that, negotiations were initiated with the Patriarchate of Constantinople, and in 1920 the entire region was again returned to the jurisdiction of the Serbian Orthodox Church. In 1930, Metropolitan Varnava Rosić of Skopje was elected Serbian Patriarch.

In 1959, the Serbian Orthodox Church granted ecclesiastical autonomy to eparchies in the Republic of Macedonia. After the unilateral and uncanonical proclamation of autocephaly of the Macedonian Orthodox Church in 1967, ecclesiastical order was disrupted for a long time. When the Republic of Macedonia (now North Macedonia) proclaimed its independence from Yugoslavia in 1992, the Serbian Orthodox Church decided to place all eparchies in Macedonia under special administration. In 1993, auxiliary bishop Jovan Mladenović of Tetovo (in the region of Polog near Skopje) was appointed administrator of all eparchies in the Republic of Macedonia. The following year, he was transferred to another see and administration of eparchies in the Republic of Macedonia was given to Bishop Pahomije Gačić of Vranje. In 2002, the Eparchy of Skopje was placed under the administration of Bishop Jovan Vraniškovski of Veles, as an exarch of the Serbian patriarch. In 2005, he was confirmed as Archbishop of Ohrid and Metropolitan of Skopje. The Macedonian Orthodox Church was received into canonical Orthodoxy in 2023 and the OOA was merged into it.

== Heads ==
Early bishops of ancient Scupi (Dardania)

Name	Original name in Greek	Notes
Dacus	Δάκος	Attended First Council of Nicaea in 325.
Paregorius	Παρηγόριος	Attended Council of Serdica in 343.
Ursilius	Ουρσίλιος	Mentioned in 458, in a letter of Emperor Leo I.
Johannes	Ιωάννης	Mentioned from 490 to 495, in letters of Pope Gelasius I.

Metropolitans of Skopje (since 1766, list incomplete)

Picture	Name (Tenure)	Notes
	Anthimos (1767—1775)	Άνθιμος
	Zacharias (1775—1799)	Ζαχαρίας
	Anthimos (1799—1820)	Άνθιμος
	Joasaph (1820—1823)	Ιωάσαφ
	Ananias (1823—1828)	Ανανίας
	Neophytos (1828—1830)	Νεόφυτος
	Gennadios (1831—1832)	Γεννάδιος
	Gavril (1832—1843)	Γαβριήλ (d. 1843)
	Joachim (1844—1868)	Ιωακείμ (d. 1868)
	Paisios (1868—1891)	Παΐσιος (d. 1891)
	Methodios Papaemmanouil (1891—1896)	Μεθόδιος Παπαεμμανουήλ (d. 1896)
	Amvrosios Stavrianos (1896—1899)	Αμβρόσιος Σταυρινός (b. 1854 - d. 1931)
	Firmilijan Dražić (1902—1903)	Фирмилијан Дражић (Serbian)
	Sevastijan Debeljković (1904—1905)	Севастијан Дебељковић (Serbian)
	Vićentije Krdžić (1905—1915)	Вићентије Крџић (Serbian). Murdered by Bulgarians in 1915
	Varnava Rosić (1920—1930)	Варнава Росић (Serbian)
	Josif Cvijović (1932—1957)	Јосиф Цвијовић (Serbian)
	Dositej Stojković (1959—1967)	Доситеј Стојковић. Since 1967, head of self-proclaimed "Macedonian Orthodox Church"
	Jovan Mladenović 1993—1994	Administrator
	Pahomije Gačić 1995—2002	Administrator
	Jovan Vraniškovski (2005—2023)	Orthodox Ohrid Archbishopric

== See also ==
- Eparchy of Debar and Kičevo
- Eparchy of Polog and Kumanovo
- List of eparchies of the Serbian Orthodox Church

== Sources ==
- Harnack, Adolf (1905). The Expansion of Christianity in the First Three Centuries. Vol. 2. New York: Putnam's Sons.
- Zeiller, Jacques (1918). Les origines chrétiennes dans les provinces danubiennes de l'Empire romain. Paris: E. De Boccard.
- Slijepčević, Đoko M. (1958). The Macedonian Question: The Struggle for Southern Serbia. Chicago: The American Institute for Balkan Affairs.
- Papazoglu, Fanula (1978). The Central Balkan Tribes in pre-Roman Times: Triballi, Autariatae, Dardanians, Scordisci and Moesians. Amsterdam: Hakkert. ISBN 9789025607937.
- Јанковић, Марија (1985). Епископије и митрополије Српске цркве у средњем веку (Bishoprics and Metropolitanates of Serbian Church in Middle Ages). Београд: Историјски институт САНУ.
- Грујић, Радослав (1993). Азбучник Српске православне цркве. Београд: БИГЗ, Музеј СПЦ. ISBN 978-86-13-00688-6.
- Fine, John Van Antwerp Jr. (1994). The Late Medieval Balkans: A Critical Survey from the Late Twelfth Century to the Ottoman Conquest. The University of Michigan Press. ISBN 0472082604.
- Вуковић, Сава (1996). Српски јерарси од деветог до двадесетог века (Serbian Hierarchs from the 9th to the 20th Century). Евро, Унирекс, Каленић.
- Stephenson, Paul (2000). Byzantium's Balkan Frontier: A Political Study of the Northern Balkans, 900–1204. Cambridge University Press. ISBN 9780521770170.
- Curta, Florin (2001). The Making of the Slavs: History and Archaeology of the Lower Danube Region, c. 500–700. Cambridge: Cambridge University Press. ISBN 9781139428880.
- Pavlowitch, Stevan K. (2002). Serbia: The History behind the Name. London: Hurst & Company. ISBN 9781850654773.
- Popović, Svetlana (2002). "The Serbian Episcopal sees in the thirteenth century (Српска епископска седишта у XIII веку)". Старинар (51: 2001): 171–184.
- Ćirković, Sima (2004). The Serbs. Malden: Blackwell Publishing. ISBN 9781405142915.
- Curta, Florin (2006). Southeastern Europe in the Middle Ages, 500–1250. Cambridge: Cambridge University Press.
- Petrović, Vladimir P. (2007). "Pre-Roman and Roman Dardania: Historical and Geographical Considerations" (PDF). Balcanica (37). Balkanološki institut SANU: 7–23.
- Kiminas, Demetrius (2009). The Ecumenical Patriarchate: A History of Its Metropolitanates with Annotated Hierarch Catalogs. Wildside Press LLC. ISBN 9781434458766.
- Sotirović, Vladislav B. (2011). "The Serbian Patriarchate of Peć in the Ottoman Empire: The First Phase (1557–94)". Serbian Studies: Journal of the North American Society for Serbian Studies. 25 (2): 143–169. doi:10.1353/ser.2011.0038. S2CID 143629322.
- Bulić, Dejan (2013). "The Fortifications of the Late Antiquity and the Early Byzantine Period on the Later Territory of the South-Slavic Principalities, and their re-occupation". The World of the Slavs: Studies of the East, West and South Slavs: Civitas, Oppidas, Villas and Archeological Evidence (7th to 11th Centuries AD). Istorijski institut SANU. pp. 137–234. ISBN 978-86-7743-104-4.
- Mócsy, András (2014) [1974]. Pannonia and Upper Moesia: A History of the Middle Danube Provinces of the Roman Empire. New York: Routledge. ISBN 9781317754251.
