= Firmilijan Dražić =

Serbian Orthodox metropolitan of Skopje

Portrait of Dražić

Firmilijan Dražić (secular name Dimitrije Dražić; Serbian Cyrillic: Фирмилијан Дражић; 20 August 1852 — 7 December 1903) was the Metropolitan of Skopje, from 1902 to 1903. He was the first Serb to head the Metropolitanate of Skopje after the abolition of the Peć Patriarchate:

== Biography ==
Dimitrije Drazić was born and baptized in Šabac on 20 August 1852. He finished Gymnasium in Šabac, and worked as a merchant for four years. He became a monk and was given the name of Firmilijan in 1869 in the Petkovica monastery. He attended the Serbian Orthodox Seminary of St. Sava in Belgrade. He studied theology first on the island of Halki in Heybeliada in the Sea of Marmara, and then in Athens. While in Athens he was an unofficial delegate of liberal Jovan Ristić at conferences and lectures concerning Balkan state of affairs. He studied philosophy in Prague, after the Belgrade seminary. In order to support himself in the Czech Republic then part of Austria-Hungary, he also worked as a bricklayer's assistant. From 1876 to 1878 he administered the Vranje diocese. During 1880, he was elected professor of the Belgrade Seminary of Saint Sava. He was considered one of the most learned and active representatives of the church.

== Rector of the Seminary of Saint Sava ==
Once he became archimandrite in 1883, he was offered the then vacant position of Metropolitan of Serbia, but Firmilian refused that post. He was Prince Aleksandar Obrenović's teacher. When he was elected rector of the Belgrade's Seminary of Saint Sava, he founded a fund for poor theologians and introduced public lectures, a novelty at the time. For a while, he edited the journal of the Serbian Orthodox Church called Glasnik (Herald). He was one of the founders of the Society of Saint Sava during 1886. He went to Chicago in 1891 at the invitation of American Serbs and was their parish priest.

== Metropolitan Firmilian ==
After America, he went to Constantinople to help the Serbian church from there. It was a difficult time for the Serbian Orthodox Church within the Ottoman Empire, because the Patriarchate of Constantinople and the Bulgarian Exarchate had official permits from the Turkish authorities for uninterrupted work in Old Serbia, and the Serbian Church had to work illegally or within the dictates of the Constantinople Patriarchate. The Bulgarian Exarchate tried to prevent the functioning of the Serbian Orthodox Church in the part of Old Serbia that mainly includes today's Macedonia. The work of the Exarchate was first focused on taking over Serbian churches and expelling their priests, and then ordering parishioners to change their names to Bulgarian. Serbian priests, teachers and cultural workers were intimidated or harassed. The Serbian Church had the right to operate only within the confines of the Patriarchate of Constantinople, which was totally under Greek Phanariot control. In Constantinople, Firmilijan worked closely with Stojan Novaković. The diplomatic struggle for the Skopje metropolitan throne lasted five years. He was elected administrator of the Skopje diocese in 1897, and metropolitan of the Skopje diocese in 1899.

After the abolition of the Patriarchate of Peć, he was the first Serb to be given that position. However, due to great resistance, he was ordained only on 15 June 1902.

Since the division of the nation into official millets was still valid in the Turkish Empire at that time, Bishop Firmilijan was worried about the lack of official recognition of the Serbian millet, as a result of which Serbs were included in the "Romanian millet" (dominated by Greek Phanariots) or "Bulgarian millet" (under the domination of the Bulgarian Exarchate). In that sense, on 12 August 1903, bishop Firmilijan complained to the consul of the Kingdom of Serbia in Skopje:

"In the Turkish Empire, all nationalities are divided: 1. Muslims, 2. Greeks (Rum-millet) and 3. Bulgarians-millet, and there are no Serb-millet anywhere, even if the Turks took these lands only from the Serbs and the Serbs lived in them and had their own empire, today, before the Turkish law we are nowhere registered and recorded as Serbs as though we do not exist!" Thus, bishop Firmilijan pointed out the need for Serbs to be recognized in the Turkish Empire under their national name. Thankfully to his efforts and the consulate in Skopje, that was done before the turn of the century.

Firmilijan was closely connected with the revolutionary leader Jovan Ćirković, and other members of the Saint Sava Society.

Metropolitan Firmilijan died in 1903 in Belgrade, at the age of 52, as a guest of his brother Pero Dražić, a hotelier.

== Works ==
He authored 10 books of theological content

- I-III - "Interpretation of the Gospel with Sermons"
- IV - Parish priest Trebnik
- V - Dogmatic Theology I
- VI - Dogmatic Theology II
- VII - Biblical pastoral part
- VIII - Dogmatic moral part
- IX - Textbooks and the Christian home
- X - Instructive part
