= Ninov =

Ninov is a Slavic family name, may refer to:

- David Ninov (born 1972), Macedonian bishop
- Orlin Ninov (born 1970), Bulgarian rower
- Victor Ninov (born 1959), Bulgarian physicist
- Viktor Ninov (born 1988), Bulgarian footballer
