= Vićentije Krdžić =

Serbian Orthodox bishop

Saint Vićentije of Skoplje
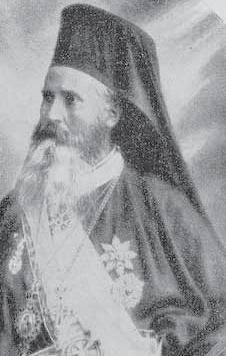

New Venerable Hieromartyr
- Born: 30 January 1853; Ušće, Serbia
- Died: 1915; Gnjilane, Serbia
- Venerated in: Eastern Orthodox Church
- Canonized: 26 May 2017 by Serbian Orthodox Church
- Feast: 25 May (O.S. 16 May)
- Attributes: Vested as a metropolitan, Holding a cross

Vićentije Krdžić (secular name Vasilije Krdžić; 30 January 1853 - Belgrade, Kingdom of Serbia, 1915) he was the third Serbian metropolitan of the Eparchy of Skoplje. He fell victim to the Bulgarians at the end of 1915.

== Biography ==
He was born on 30 January 1853 in Ušće. He finished primary school in Studenica Monastery, and he graduated from the Bogoslovija seminary in Belgrade. He became a monk in the Studenica Monastery 1873, and in the same year he was consecrated deacon. Until 1885, he was in the Studenica monastery when he became an Abbot in 1887, and by 1890 he was an elder at a Ovčar-Kablar Gorge monastery, better known as the Svete Trojice i Sretenja in Ovčar. He was consecrated archimandrite in 1894. He was also in the monastery Hilandar since 1900 as a council elder.

== Bishop of the Diocese of Skopje ==
After the death of Bishop Sevastijan Debeljković in 1905, he was elected and consecrated in Constantinople as the Bishop of the Skopje Diocese. He was the third Serbian bishop after the abolition of the Patriarchate of Peć. During his tenure, active church, national and educational work in Macedonia continued. Although there was always a threat of Bulgarian terror, more and more people in Macedonia returned to the Serbian Orthodox Church, leaving Bulgarian Exarchate. Vićentije played a prominent role in the coordination of Serbian Chetnik Action in Macedonia. During 1907, among the organizers Serbian Chetnik actions there was a division into two currents, the consular and the metropolitan current. Vićentije was at the head of the metropolitan current and tried to completely take over the leadership of the revolutionary organization and education in Macedonia. Until then, the Serbian consuls managed the revolutionary organization and education. The metropolitan current had the support of the opposition press in Serbia, and in a similar way, the bishop of Nićifor Perić also opposed Serbian diplomacy on the consular level in Old Serbia. However, at the end of 1907, the consular current prevailed by relocated several Vićentije-friendly teachers and prevented Vićentije Krdžić and Nićifor Perić from being linked.

== Demise of Metropolitan Vićentije ==
At the end of 1915, Bulgaria joined the enemies of Serbia in World War I and the Serbian army was forced to withdraw while three nations—Germany, Austria-Hungary, and Bulgaria—occupied Serbia. Vićentije then withdrew to Prizren, where he was arrested by the Bulgarians and taken to Bulgaria. However, on the way from Ferizaj to Gjilan, even though accompanied by Bulgarian security personnel he was robbed and killed. His body was never found, but it was said that the body was burned after the murder. The 25th anniversary of his death was marked on 15 December 1940.

Since 2017, the Serbian Orthodox Church commemorates him together with another victim in the hands of the Bulgarians Vladimir Protić (1843-1915) as saints - priest-martyrs. The church consecrated him as a saint on 16 May according to the church Julian calendar, and the 25 May according to Gregorian calendar.

Eastern Orthodox Church titles
Preceded by Sevastijan Debeljković	Metropolitan of Skopje; 1905–1915	Succeeded by Varnava Rosić
