= Nicholas I of Ohrid =

- Archbishop of Ohrid
- Native name: Νικόλαος Α΄ Οχρίδας
- Church: Eastern Orthodox Church
- Diocese: Archbishopric of Ohrid
- Installed: c. 1340
- Term ended: c. 1350

Personal details
- Denomination: Eastern Orthodox Christianity
- Residence: Ohrid

Nicholas I of Ohrid (Greek: Νικόλαος Α΄ Οχρίδας; Bulgarian, Macedonian and Serbian: Никола I Охридски) was Eastern Orthodox Archbishop of Ohrid, from c. 1340 to c. 1350.

In 1334, the Archbishopric of Ohrid came under Serbian rule, preserving its ecclesiastical autonomy. On Easter Day, 16 April 1346, the Serbian King Stefan Dušan convoked the state assembly in Skopje, attended by the Serbian Archbishop Joanikije II, Archbishop Nikolas I of Ohrid, the Bulgarian Patriarch Simeon and various religious leaders of Mount Athos. On that occasion, Serbian Archbishopric of Peć was raised to the status of a Patriarchate. The Archbishopric of Ohrid was not annexed to the Serbian Patriarchate of Peć and kept its autonomy, recognizing only the honorary seniority of the Serbian Patriarch.

== Sources ==
- Ćirković, Sima (2004). The Serbs. Malden: Blackwell Publishing. ISBN 9781405142915.
- Fine, John Van Antwerp Jr. (1994) [1987]. The Late Medieval Balkans: A Critical Survey from the Late Twelfth Century to the Ottoman Conquest. Ann Arbor, Michigan: University of Michigan Press. ISBN 0472082604.

Religious titles
Preceded by Anthimus Metochites	Archbishop of Ohrid; 1346	Succeeded by Gregory II
