= Orthodox Ohrid Archbishopric =

Former Autonomous archbishopric of the Serbian Orthodox Church

- Coat of arms

Location
- Territory: North Macedonia

Information
- Denomination: Eastern Orthodox Church
- Established: 2002 (2005)
- Dissolved: 2023

Leadership
- Parent church: Serbian Orthodox Church
- Governance: Autonomous Archbishopric
- Archbishop: Jovan VI
- Suffragans: Prespa and Pelagonia; Bregalnica; Debar and Kičevo; Polog and Kumanovo; Veles and Povardarie; Strumica

Website
- poa-info.org

The Orthodox Ohrid Archbishopric (OOA; Serbian and Macedonian: Православна охридска архиепископија (ПОА), Pravoslavna ohridska arhiepiskopija (POA)), also known as Orthodox Archdiocese of Ohrid, was an autonomous Eastern Orthodox archbishopric of the Serbian Orthodox Church (SOC) with jurisdiction over the territory of North Macedonia. Its creation was initiated in 2002 and formalized in 2005.

The Orthodox Ohrid Archbishopric was refused registration by the State Religion Commission of North Macedonia on the grounds that one group may be registered for each confession and that the name was not sufficiently distinct from that of the Macedonian Orthodox Church (MOC).

In 2023, after the reconciliation of the SOC and the MOC, the OOA was integrated into MOC.

== Creation ==
Some Macedonian bishops sought to reconcile their differences with the Serbian Orthodox Church (SOC) and negotiated regarding the status of the Macedonian Orthodox Church (MOC), which had separated from SOC since its self-declared autocephaly in 1967. These negotiations led to an agreement that was signed in Niš in May 2002 - the Niš Agreement. Three bishops of both delegations signed the agreement. It was supposed to grant MOC autonomous status. The signing of the document caused an uproar in Macedonia (now North Macedonia). The Macedonian bishops attempted to defend it for a short time. It was soon rejected by the Synod of MOC. The Serbian patriarch Pavle invited all MOC's bishops, clergy, monastics and faithful people to enter into liturgical and canonical unity with the Serbian Orthodox Church. Jovan Vraniškovski and all priests of Veles agreed to respond to this call, and all signed a document of agreement. Vraniškovski was the only metropolitan to accept the invitation.

On 23 September 2002, Metropolitan Jovan was appointed Exarch of all the territories of the Ohrid Archdiocese by the Assembly of the Serbian Orthodox Church. On 25 December 2003, he was elected Chairman of the Holy Synod of Bishops of the Orthodox Ohrid Archbishopric, after it had been constituted. On 24 May 2005, he was confirmed by the Serbian Patriarch as Archbishop of Ohrid and Metropolitan of Skopje in accordance with the Niš Agreement. On the same day, there was an announcement of the Patriarchal and the Assembly's tomos for autonomy of the Ohrid Archbishopric, with Archbishop Jovan as the Chairman of the Holy Synod of Bishops. Its seat was in the village of Nižepole and it had the purpose of administering the dioceses of the Serbian Orthodox Church in North Macedonia. As it had internal autonomy as the canonical branch of the Serbian Orthodox Church, it could also rely on the support of all canonical Orthodox churches. The Archbishopric claimed inheritance from the Archbishopric of Ohrid, established in 1019 by Byzantine Emperor Basil II and abolished in 1767 by the Ottomans.

It considered itself the true "Macedonian Orthodox Church", in opposition to the MOC, whom it labelled "schismatics":

So You, being a limb of the Government, which means the Government of the Republic of Macedonia, stand behind seven unrecognized bishops and protect their interests. These are not the interests of the MOC, because the real Macedonian Orthodox Church is the Orthodox Ohrid Archbishopric. This is the legitimate Church, recognized by all other Churches in the world, so whoever wants to be orthodox is welcome, the doors are open, and whoever wants to be schismatic let him be with the schismatic Synod. The Orthodox Ohrid Archbishopric doesn’t mind the state having in its register the schismatics, just as it has in its list the various sects, but it does mind if the state apparatus prohibits its spiritual and pastoral functioning on the territory of the R. Macedonia.

— Jovan Vraniškovski (24 January 2004)

== Issues with the state ==
In January 2004, Vraniškovski and a dozen of his followers were arrested by the police. A fifth monastery, Saint John Chrysostom in the village Nižepole near Bitola, was broken into by armed and masked men, who harassed and threatened the nuns with machine guns, cut their hair and set the monastery on fire, in February 2004. Following the rejection of its registration application by the Macedonian authorities, the police raided Orthodox Ohrid Archbishopric's buildings. The police and priests of the Macedonian Orthodox Church visited members to pressure them to abandon their adherence to OOA. The Church in the Saint John Chrysostom monastery was demolished by the state authorities on 15 October 2004. The chapel St. Nectarios of Aegina was demolished on 12 July 2005 in the Skopje suburb of Dračevo. Additional harassment complaints have been reported.

Archbishop Jovan was sentenced to 18 months of prison in June 2005 for "[i]nstigation of ethnic, racial and religious hatred, discord and intolerance". The verdict stated the conviction relied on these three points:

1. He wrote a text in a religious calendar in which he slandered the Macedonian Orthodox Church.
2. He agreed to be appointed as an Exarch of the Ohrid Archbishopric in Macedonia and participated in the ordination of the bishops Joakim (Jovčevski) and Marko (Kimev).
3. He officiated at a religious service in an apartment owned by his parents.

He served 220 days in prison before the Supreme Court declared the last two of the three points to be unconstitutional and his sentence was shortened to 8 months. Archbishop Jovan was sentenced for the second time, on charges for Embezzlement, and as a second defendant was sentenced to a higher prison term of 2 years than the first defendant (who was sentenced 1 year and 3 months) in 2006. He served 256 days before being released. The Orthodox Ohrid Archbishopric was repeatedly denied registration by the state authorities.

=== International reactions ===
- The United States Department of State includes in its "Religious Freedom Report" and "Human Rights Report" information regarding the "restrictions of the religious freedoms of the members of the Orthodox Ohrid Archbishopric, existence of religious prisoners, violation of freedom of movement, police terror and demolition of a monastery, prevention of OSCE from obtaining a copy of the decision upon which the demolition was carried out, police interrogations of the members of the Orthodox Ohrid Archbishopric etc."
- The US Mission to the OSCE in 2004 warned of "Violation of freedom of religion and encouraged the authorities to apply the law fairly, advising the government should avoid involving in religious disputes, reminding that Article Nine of the European Convention on Human Rights and Article 19 of the Macedonian Constitution as well as Macedonia’s OSCE commitments, and international norms, all guarantee his right to freedom of religion".
- The European Commission pointed out that "cases of violations of religious freedom exist and emphasized that the new law should provide more liberal procedure for registering religious communities".
- The European Court of Human Rights ruled in 2018 that the refusal of the government to register the Orthodox Ohrid Archbishopric constitutes a violation of the European Convention on Human Rights.
- Amnesty International declared the Archbishop Jovan as a prisoner of conscience in 2004.
- In Freedom House's 2005 publication, "Macedonia received a downward trend arrow due to [...] an increase in the harassment of leaders of various religious groups". Freedom House reported in 2007 that Archbishop Jovan has been "arrested [...] for his ties to the Serbian Orthodox Church."
- The Helsinki Committee for Human Rights reported about the violation of the religious freedoms and human rights of the members of the Orthodox Ohrid Archbishopric: "The violation of several basic rights was the result of activities of a number of state institutions (especially the Ministry of the Interior) directed against not only the followers (monks of the MOC who were supporting Vraniskovski), but also against citizens who approve of him or had compassionate sentiments or attitude towards them. This can be illustrated by the following: problems upon entry and exit from the state, threats, police detention, lawsuits against citizens who have provided housing for the outcast monks, police ban in the exercise of the right to residence".
- Commission on Security and Cooperation in Europe reported about the imprisonment of Archbishop Jovan in 2005, finding that "Macedonian officials, in response to the ecclesiastical dispute concerning the status of the Macedonian Orthodox Church, have over-reacted and that the 18-month prison term sentence is excessive and unjustified". Regarding the case of the destruction of the chapel, the report states that "The government, at least, must exhibit more restraint and end these harassments, and also pay reparations for the destroyed buildings. The report also covers the religious freedom governing legal framework, finding it ambiguous, and further stating that Since religious groups are required to register, the lack of a clear mechanism can be problematic."
- Norwegian human rights organization Forum 18 reported in 2008 that the country's 2007 religion law perpetuates discrimination.
- Ecumenical Patriarch Bartholomew I of Constantinople sent a letter to the Prime Minister of Macedonia, requesting immediate release of Archbishop Jovan.
- Patriarch Alexy II of Moscow sent a letter to the President of Macedonia in 2005, demanding immediate release of the Archbishop Jovan.
- Holy Synod of Hierarchs of the Church of Greece expressed a severe protest in 2006 for an emergent release of Archbishop Jovan from prison, and for respect of religious freedom in Macedonia.
- The Holy Community of the Mount Athos sent a letter of support to the Archbishop Jovan in 2004, signed by all representatives and abbots who are in the common Assembly of the twenty Holy Monasteries of the Holy Mount Athos.
- The Standing Conference of the Canonical Orthodox Bishops in the Americas condemned the imprisonment of Archbishop Jovan by Macedonia and asked for his release in 2005.
- Metropolitan Herman of the Orthodox Church in America called for release of Archbishop Jovan of Ohrid in 2006.

== Abolition ==
=== Decision to resolve the dispute with the MOC ===
On 15 May 2022 at the first session of the annual meeting of the Holy Council of Bishops of the Serbian Orthodox Church, an Encyclical on the Occasion of the Centennial Celebration of the Re-establishment of the Serbian Patriarchate was adopted and signed by all bishops of the Serbian Orthodox Church (SOC), including all four bishops of the Orthodox Ohrid Archbishopric (OOA). At the second session, held on 16 May, the Council decided to resolve various disputes with the Macedonian Orthodox Church (MOC), thus healing the long-standing schism.

On 19 May, a historical concelebration was held in Belgrade, by bishops of the MOC and the Serbian Orthodox Church, including bishops of the OOA. On that occasion, archbishop Jovan (head of OOA) held a speech, expressing the support of the OOA to the restoration of ecclesiastical unity.

On 24 May, during the visit of Serbian Patriarch Porphyry to Skopje, the decision of SOC to recognize autocephaly of MOC was announced, and concelebration was held by hierarchs of the MOC and the SOC, including hierarchs of the OOC. On that occasion, the Patriarch emphasized in his speech that the Holy Council of Bishops of the SOC had set as task for the Synod to resolve all remaining technical and organizational issues. Some of the most important organizational issues were related to the future status of the OOA, but no concrete decisions on a possible organizational unification of the OOA and the MOC were announced. Due to those circumstances, the OOA hierarchy did not attend the publication of the patriarchal tomos on the autocephaly of the MOC, which was handed over in Belgrade, on 5 June 2022.

=== Merge into the Macedonian Orthodox Church ===
The Assembly of the Serbian Orthodox Church announced on 20 May 2023 that it had decided to integrate the OOA into the MOC. On 23 May, upon the decision of the Holy Assembly of Bishops of SOC, the process of integration of the OOA with the MOC was initiated, and OOA bishops were given canonical permission to join the jurisdiction of the MOC. Further steps towards integration were made on June by the Synod of the MOC, initiating the creation of new dioceses for OOA hierarchs. On 21 June, OOA hierarchs collectively joined the MOC and were assigned dioceses. On 28 June, the Holy Synod of the OOA made an official announcement, stating that it has fulfilled its mission, and noting that OOA hierarchs have collectively joined the MOC.

== Structure ==
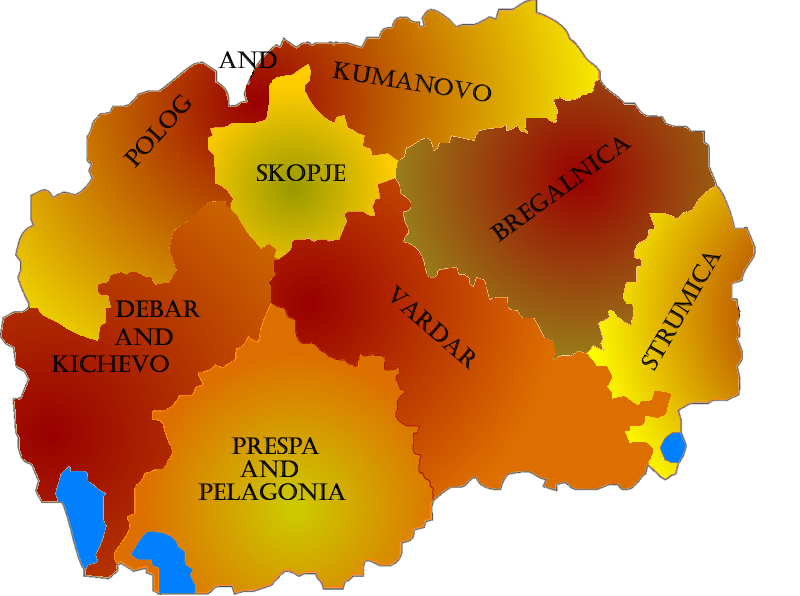
Map of the seven diocese of OOA in North Macedonia

Dioceses on the territory of North Macedonia were:

1. Metropolitanate of Skopje, an Archdiocese, headed by the Archbishop of Ohrid;
2. Eparchy of Prespa and Pelagonia;
3. Eparchy of Bregalnica;
4. Eparchy of Debar and Kičevo;
5. Eparchy of Polog and Kumanovo;
6. Eparchy of Veles and Povardarie (Vardar);
7. Eparchy of Strumica;

During its existence, the Orthodox Ohrid Archbishopric was headed by Archbishop Jovan VI of Ohrid. He presided over the Holy Synod of Hierarchs of the Orthodox Ohrid Archbishopric, consisting of him and 3 more bishops. The Holy Synod of bishops was constituted on 23 December 2003 in the monastery of Saint John Chrysostom. Members of the synod were:

- Archbishop Jovan of Ohrid and Metropolitan of Skopje; locum tenens of Veles and Povardarie.
- Bishop Joakim (Jovčevski) of Polog and Kumanovo; locum tenens of Debar and Kičevo.
- Bishop Marko (Kimev) of Bregalnica; locum tenens of Prespa and Pelagonia.
- Vicar bishop David (Ninov) of Stobi; locum tenens of Strumica.

== See also ==
- Archbishopric of Ohrid
  - Archbishop of Ohrid
- Metropolitanate of Skopje
- List of eparchies of the Serbian Orthodox Church

== Literature ==
- Čairović, Ivica (2018). "The role of vicar bishop Dositej (Stojković) at the beginning of the church schism in Macedonia in 1958" (PDF). Istorija 20. Veka. 36 (2): 155–186.
- Лунић, Томислав А. (2020). "Македонски раскол - Однос Православне Охридске Архиепископије и МПЦ (The Macedonian Schism - The Relationship of the Orthodox Archdiocese of Ohrid and the Macedonian Orthodox Church)" (PDF). Теолошки погледи. 53 (1): 145–160. Archived from the original (PDF) on 2022-07-04.
- Манојловић, Милка; Манојловић, Марко (2017). "Историјски пресек и анализа судских процеса против Архиепископа охридског г. г. Јована, Eпископа, свештенства, монаштва и верног народа Православне Охридске Архиепископије, у периоду од 2002–2016. године" (PDF). Српска теологија данас. 8 (2016): 237–250.
- Slijepčević, Đoko M. (1958). The Macedonian Question: The Struggle for Southern Serbia. Chicago: The American Institute for Balkan Affairs.
- Слијепчевић, Ђоко М. (1969). Македонско црквено питање. Минхен: Искра.
- Слијепчевић, Ђоко М. (1986). Историја Српске православне цркве. Vol. 3. Келн: Искра.
- Пузовић, Предраг (1999). "Раскол у Српској православној цркви - македонско црквено питање (The Rift in the Serbian Orthodox Church - The Macedonian Church Issue)". Вардарски зборник (1): 155–173.
- Vasić, Dušan N.; Vasić, Nina D. (2014). "Violation of human rights and religious freedom of archbishop Jovan of Ohrid" (PDF). International Journal of Economics and Law. 4 (10): 138–144. Archived from the original (PDF) on 2022-10-13.
