= David Ninov =

Macedonian poet and theologian (born 1972)

His Grace David Давид
- Bishop of Dremvitsa
- Native name: Давид Нинов
- Church: Macedonian Orthodox Church
- Installed: 20 June 2023
- Previous posts: Bishop of Stobi (2007–2008); Bishop of Strumitsa (Orthodox Ohrid Archbishopric) (2008–2023)

Orders
- Ordination: 1997
- Consecration: 17 June 2007

Personal details
- Born: Janko Ninov; 27 July 1972 (age 54) Skopje, SR Macedonia, SFR Yugoslavia
- Denomination: Eastern Orthodox Christianity

Bishop David (Secular name: David Ninov; Cyrillic: Давид Нинов, born Janko Ninov (Јанко Нинов) on 27 July 1972) is an Eastern Orthodox titular Bishop of Dremvit and Auxiliary Bishop of the Ardi of Skopje of the Macedonian Orthodox Church. Formerly, he was titular Bishop of Stobi (2007–2023) of the Orthodox Ohrid Archbishopric, an autonomous church under the supreme jurisdiction of Serbian Orthodox Church. While bishop of Stobi, he was also administrator of the Eparchy of Strumica.

== Biography ==
After graduating at High school for cultural sciences in Skopje, he studied ancient Greek and Latin philology at Institute for classical studies, at state Ss. Cyril and Methodius University of Skopje. He continued higher education in Greece and graduated theology at the Theological faculty of the state Aristotle University of Thessaloniki. Holds a master's degree (MTheol) from the same faculty at Aristotle University, Sector of Dogmatics, History of Philosophy and Ecumenical Theology.

Before entering monastic life he was the editor of the periodicals for literature, art and culture and worked in the Editorial for Culture at the national television in Skopje. He published several books of poetry, and received literary awards; his works are part of several poetic anthologies, in different languages.

He entered monastic life in 1995 and was ordained a deacon in 1996 and priest in 1997. After the rejection of Niš agreement (2002) by the majority of leaders of Macedonian Orthodox Church, he joined Metropolitan Jovan (Vraniškovski) in his attempts to restore canonical order of the Eastern Orthodox Church in the Republic of Macedonia, and on 11 January 2004 he was received in full canonical communion. Because of that, he was persecuted by Macedonian state authorities. He was elected titular Bishop of Stobi on 29 June 2006 and consecrated on 17 June 2007. In 2008 he was appointed an Administrator of the Eparchy of Strumica. Since then, he was also appointed to the duties of the First Secretary of the Holy Synod of Orthodox Ohrid Archbishopric and Editor of "Sobornost", the Archbishopric's periodical. In 2015, he was appointed member of the Commission of Serbian Orthodox Church for dialogue with self-proclaimed Macedonian Orthodox Church. After the entry of the MOC-OA into canonical unity with all local Orthodox Churches, by decision of the Holy Synod of Bishops of the MOC-OA, in June 2023, he was elected Vicar bishop of the Metropolis of Skopje, with the title Bishop of Dremvitsa.

== Sources ==
- Human Rights and Collective Identity. Helsinki Committee for Human Rights in Serbia. 2005. ISBN 9788672081060.
