= Serbian Patriarchate of Peć =

Former patriarchate of the Eastern Orthodox Church

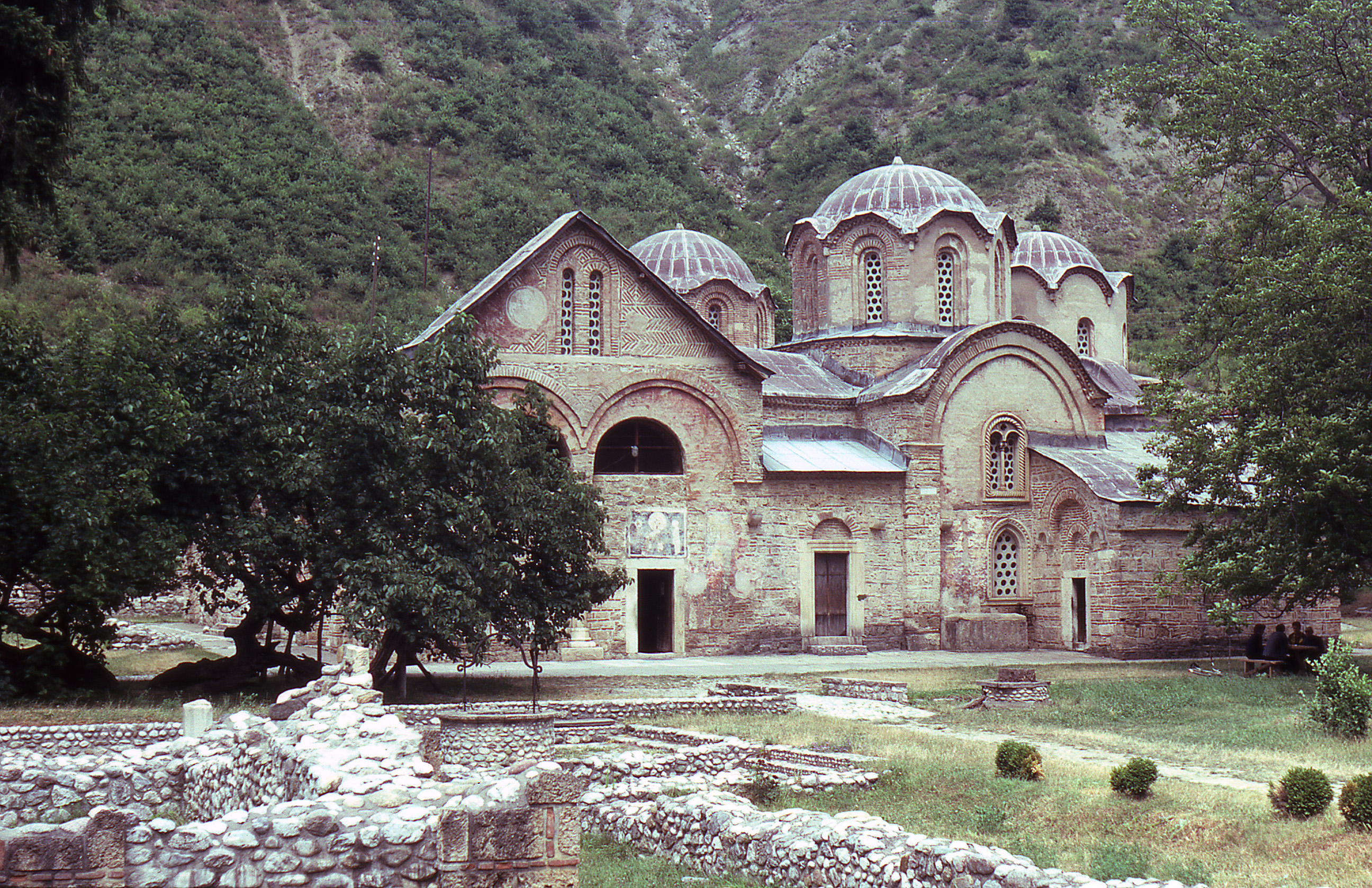
Patriarchate of Peć Monastery, seat of the Serbian Patriarchate of Peć from 1346 to 1766

Serbian Patriarchate of Peć (Serbian: Српска патријаршија у Пећи, romanized: Srpska patrijaršija u Peći), commonly known as the Peć Patriarchate (Serbian: Пећка патријаршија, romanized: Pećka patrijaršija), was an autocephalous Eastern Orthodox patriarchate that existed from 1346 to 1463, and then again from 1557 to 1766 with its seat in the Patriarchate of Peć Monastery. Primates of the Patriarchate were styled Archbishop of Peć and Serbian Patriarch.

== Medieval Period ==
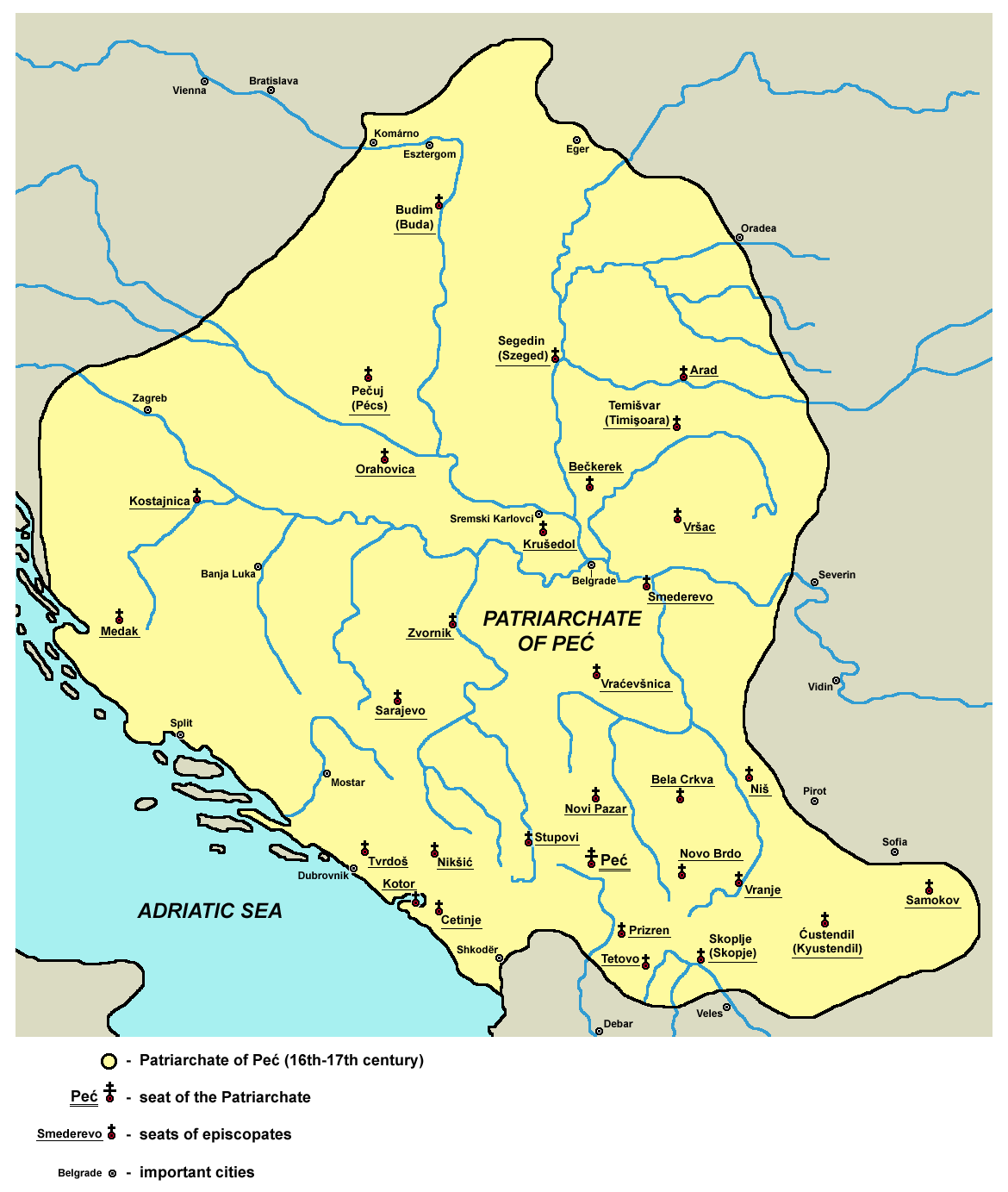
Territorial jurisdiction of the Serbian Patriarchate of Peć in 16th and 17th century

Since 1219, the Eastern Orthodox Church in the medieval Kingdom of Serbia was organized as an autocephalous archbishopric seated at first at the Žiča Monastery and since the middle of the 13th century at the Patriarchate of Peć Monastery. Expansion of the Serbian medieval state culminated under the reign of King Stefan Dušan (1331–1355), who conquered many western provinces of the declining Byzantine Empire. Since 1334, the seat of the ancient Archbishopric of Ohrid was under Serbian rule, and by 1345 Serbian forces completed the conquest of northern Greece, including the city of Serres, capital of eastern Macedonia and the seat of an important metropolitanate. To mark the occasion, Stefan Dušan was proclaimed Emperor on 25 December 1345 (Christmas) in Serres. Since it was customary for an emperor to be crowned by a patriarch, newly proclaimed Tsar Stefan Dušan decided to convoke a joint state and church assembly (sabor) that was held on 16 April 1346 (Easter) in the Serbian capital city of Skopje. This assembly was attended by Serbian Archbishop Joanikije II, Archbishop Nicholas I of Ohrid, Patriarch Simeon of Bulgaria and many other hierarchs and church dignitaries, including monastic leaders of Mount Athos. The assembly proclaimed the raising of the autocephalous Serbian Archbishopric to the rank of Patriarchate. The Archbishop of Peć was titled Serbian Patriarch, and his seat at the Patriarchate of Peć Monastery became the patriarchal residence. On the same occasion, the newly proclaimed Serbian Patriarch Joanikije II solemnly crowned Stefan Dušan as the "Emperor of Serbs and Greeks".

The proclamation of the Patriarchate resulted in raising main dioceses to the rank of honorary metropolitanates, starting with the diocese of Skopje that was raised to Metropolitanate of Skopje. The Patriarchate took over supreme ecclesiastical jurisdiction over Mount Athos and many Greek eparchies in Aegean Macedonia that were until then under the jurisdiction of the Ecumenical Patriarchate of Constantinople. The same process continued after the Serbian conquests of Thessaly, Epirus, Aetolia, and Acarnania in 1347 and 1348. At the same time, the Archbishopric of Ohrid remained autocephalous, recognizing the honorary primacy of the new Serbian Patriarchate.

Since proclamation of the Patriarchate was performed without consent of the Patriarchate of Constantinople, various canonical and political questions were raised. Supported by the Byzantine government, Patriarch Callistus I of Constantinople issued an act of condemnation and excommunication of Emperor Stefan Dušan and Serbian Patriarch Joanikije II in 1350. That act created a rift between the Byzantine and Serbian churches, but not on dogmatic grounds, since the dispute was limited to the questions of ecclesiastical order and jurisdiction. Patriarch Joanikije II died in 1354, and his successor Patriarch Sava IV (1354–1375) faced new challenges in 1371, when Ottomans defeated the Serbian army in the Battle of Maritsa and started their expansion into Serbian lands. Since they were facing the common enemy, the Serbian and Byzantine governments and church leaders reached an agreement in 1375. The act of excommunication was revoked and the Serbian Church was recognized as a Patriarchate, under the condition of returning all eparchies in contested southern regions to the jurisdiction of the Patriarchate of Constantinople.

After the inconclusive Battle of Kosovo in 1389 and the subsequent battles, Serbia became a tributary state to the Ottoman Empire, and the Serbian Patriarchate was also affected by general social decline, since Ottomans continued their expansion and raids into Serbian lands, devastating many monasteries and churches. The city of Skopje was taken by Ottomans in 1392, and all other southern regions were taken by 1395. That led to the gradual retreat of the jurisdiction of the Serbian Patriarchate in the south and expansion of the jurisdiction of the Archbishopric of Ohrid. In 1455, the Patriarchate of Peć Monastery fell to Ottomans. Soon afterwards, the capital of Smederevo fell in 1459, marking the end of the Serbian medieval state. Patriarch Arsenije II died in 1463, and the Serbian Patriarchate sank into the period of decline.

=== Eparchies ===
- Eparchy of Belgrade, also known as Eparchy of Mačva
- Eparchy of Braničevo, also known as Eparchy of Smederevo
- Eparchy of Budimlja, in the region of Upper Polimlje
- Eparchy of Dabar, in the region of Lower Polimlje
- Eparchy of Debar, in the valley of Black Drin
- Eparchy of Drama (contested with Patriarchate of Constantinople)
- Eparchy of Hum, also known as Eparchy of Lim
- Eparchy of Hvosno, in the region of northern Metohija
- Eparchy of Melnik (contested with Patriarchate of Constantinople)
- Eparchy of Moravica, also known as Eparchy of Arilje or Eparchy of Gradac
- Eparchy of Lipljan, also known as Eparchy of Gračanica or Eparchy of Novo Brdo
- Eparchy of Polog, also known as Eparchy of Tetovo
- Eparchy of Prizren, in the region of southern Metohija
- Eparchy of Ras, also known as Eparchy of Raška
- Eparchy of Serres (contested with Patriarchate of Constantinople)
- Eparchy of Skopje, ranked first among eparchies
- Eparchy of Toplica, also known as Eparchy of Bela Crkva
- Eparchy of Velbužd, also known as Eparchy of Banja
- Eparchy of Zeta, also known as Eparchy of Cetinje
- Eparchy of Zletovo, also known as Eparchy of Lesnovo

== Vacancy Period ==
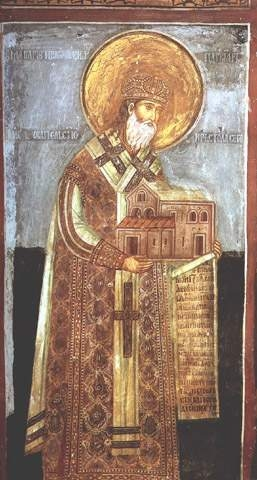
Serbian Patriarch Makarije (1557–1572)

In the second half of the 15th century, the Ottoman Empire gradually conquered all Serbian lands, starting with the Serbian Despotate in 1459, followed by the conquest of the Bosnian Kingdom in 1463, Herzegovina in 1482, and Zeta in 1496. All eparchies of the Serbian Patriarchate were devastated during Ottoman raids, and many monasteries and churches were plundered and destroyed. Because of that, the period was remembered as "The Great Desolation" (ser. великое запустение). Although some Christian Serbs converted to Islam after the Ottoman conquest, the vast majority continued their adherence to the Eastern Orthodoxy. On the other hand, the structure of the Serbian Patriarchate was deeply disrupted. After the death of Patriarch Arsenije II in 1463, the question of succession was opened. Since sources are silent, historians concluded that the period of vacancy was prolonged, resulting in de facto abolition of the patriarchal office.

At the same time, the jurisdiction of the Archbishopric of Ohrid continued to expand towards northern Serbian eparchies until it took over the entire territory of the Serbian Patriarchate. The process of falling under the rule of the Archbishopric of Ohrid unfolded at the same pace as the Serbian lands were coming under Ottoman rule. Where there was no Ottoman authority, the archbishops of Ohrid could not extend their jurisdiction. There are several instances that point to the quite independent activity of certain Serbian bishops, who are mentioned without any indication that they were subject to the Archbishop of Ohrid. This applies, above all, to the Metropolitan of Zeta (until 1496), then to the Metropolitan of Herzegovina, who resided at the Mileševa Monastery (until 1482), and to the Metropolitan of Belgrade, who was under Hungarian rule until 1526. The newly arisen situation, in which the jurisdiction of the former Serbian Church was now under the Archbishopric of Ohrid, was unacceptable to the Serbian church leaders, who wanted to restore the previous ecclesiastical order. Shortly after the Pttoman conquest of Belgrade in 1521 and victory in the Battle of Mohacs in 1526, Serbian Metropolitan Pavle of Smederevo made a series of attempts to restore the Serbian Patriarchate, and for a short time managed to seize the throne of Peć, proclaiming himself to be the new Archbishop of Peć and Serbian Patriarch, but his movement was crushed by joint forces of the Archbishopric of Ohrid and the Ecumenical Patriarchate of Constantinople, and after 1541 he went into exile. In spite of that, Serbian Church leaders continued to hope for a new chance to renew their old Patriarchate.

== Early Modern Period ==
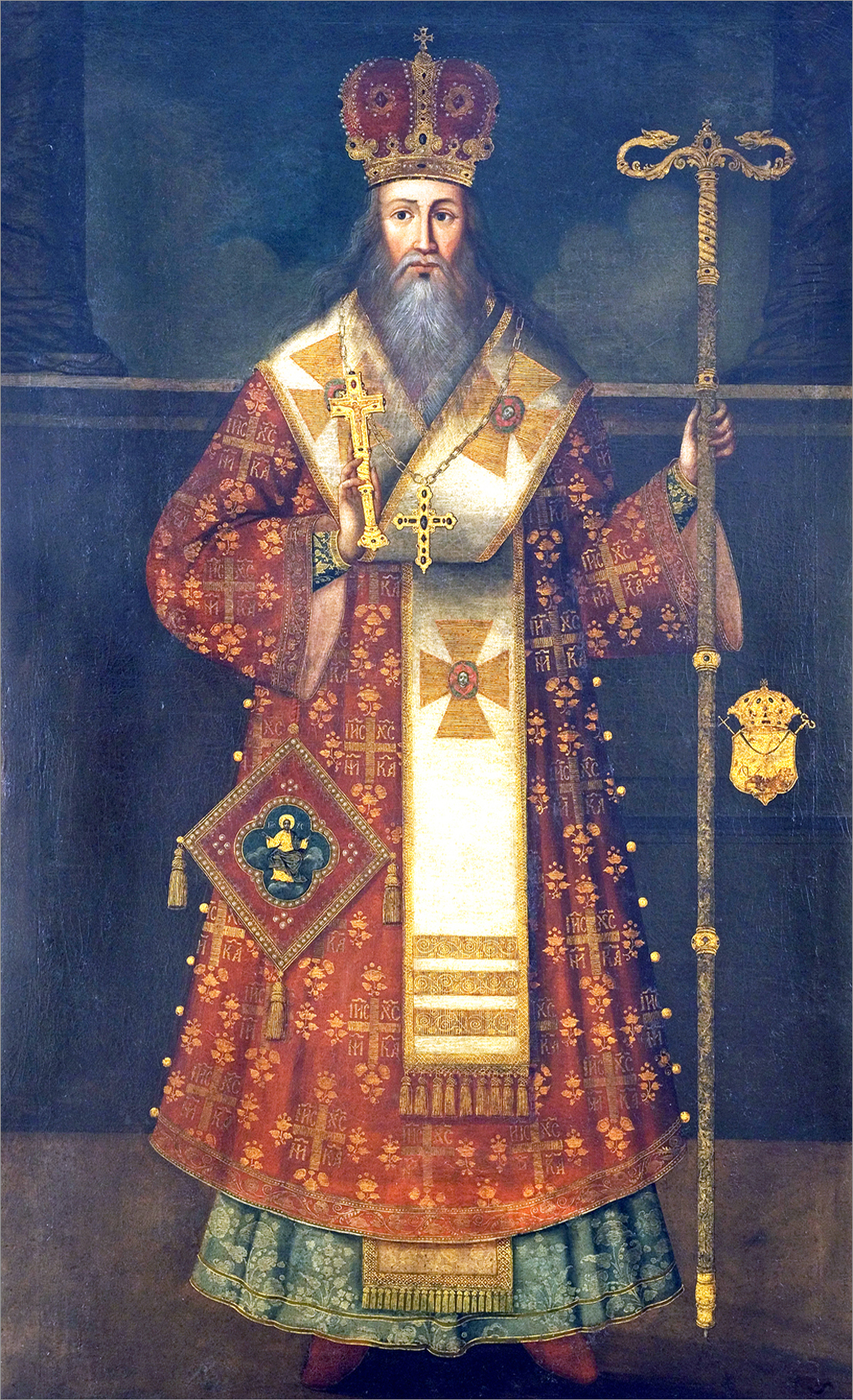
Patriarch Arsenije III, leader of the First Migration of the Serbs in 1690

Serbian Patriarchate of Peć was restored in 1557, due to the mediation of some highly influential dignitaries at the Ottoman imperial court. During the second half of the reign of Sultan Suleiman I (1520–1566), one of the most notable Ottoman statesmen was pasha Mehmed Sokolović, who served as one of the viziers since 1555 and later became Grand Vizier (1565–1579). By birth, he was an Orthodox Serb, taken from his family as a boy under the rule of Devshirme and converted into Islam. Despite that, he later restored ties with his family, and in 1557 his cousin Makarije, one of the Serbian Orthodox bishops, was elected the new Serbian Patriarch of Peć.

The full restoration of the Patriarchate was of great importance for the Orthodox Serbs because it enabled them to reorganize and improve their spiritual and cultural life under the Ottoman rule. Territorial jurisdiction of the Patriarchate was expanded towards northern and western regions, with more than 40 eparchies, from Skopje to the south, to the Eparchy of Buda to the north. Among new eparchies in western and northern regions were: the Eparchy of Požega in lower Slavonia, the Eparchy of Bačka between Danube and Tisza, and the eparchies of Vršac and Timișoara in the region of Banat. One of the largest eparchies by territory was the Dabar and Bosnia, which had jurisdiction in the region of upper Drina and throughout central and western Bosnia up to the borders of Venetian Dalmatia and the Habsburg Military Frontier. The newly restored Serbian Patriarchate also included some eparchies in western Bulgaria. The basic title of its primate was Archbishop of Peć and Serbian Patriarch, although extended patriarchal titles sometimes included not only Serbs, but also Bulgarians, and various regions in western parts of the Balkans.

According to British historian Frederick Anscombe, there was "no ethnic monopoly on appointment to supposedly ethnic church positions" in the Patriarchate of Peć and the Archbishopric of Ohrid during the Ottoman era, due to the substantial expansion of their boundaries compared to the medieval period. He also added that, for this reason, those ecclesiastical institutions were supposed to have "no ethnic nature at that time, neither formally, nor in practice". However, the vast majority of the patriarchs of Peć were Serbs and were formal successors of Saint Sava, the first Serbian archbishop, retaining the title of patriarchs "of all Serbs". Furthermore, for Serbs in Ottoman Empire, the renewed Serbian Patriarchate was a religious and ethnic symbol that substituted for their long-lost state. Therefore, the Patriarchate could not stand aside of political events and some of its leaders participated in local uprisings against Ottoman rule. At the time of Patriarch Jovan Kantul (1592–1614), the Ottoman Ottomans took the remains of Saint Sava from the Mileševa Monastery to the Vračar hill in Belgrade, where they were burned by Sinan Pasha on a stake with deliberate aim of intimidating the Serbs at the time of the Banat Uprising (1594). The present-day Church of Saint Sava in Belgrade was built on the place where his remains were burned.

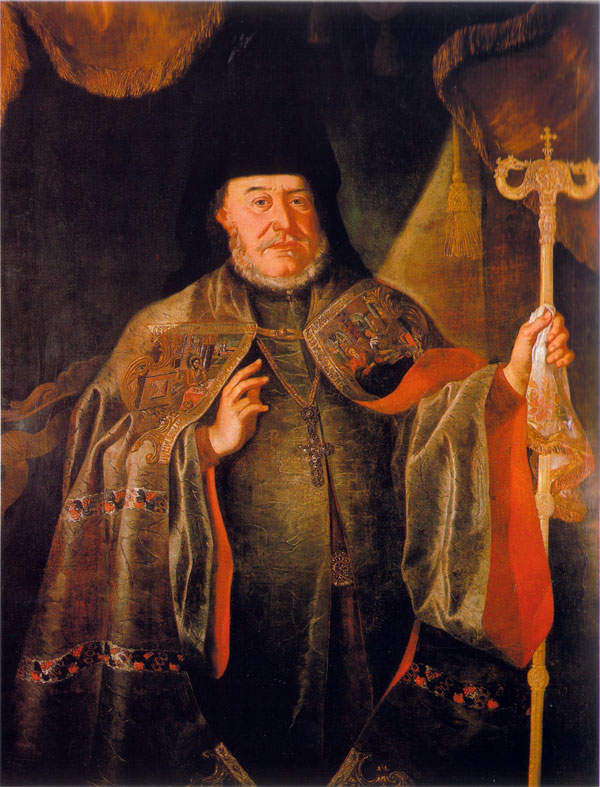
Serbian Patriarch Arsenije IV, leader of the Second Migration of Serbs in 1737

The turning point in the history of the Serbian Patriarchate was marked by the events of the Great Turkish War. During the war years, relations between Muslims and Christians in European provinces of the Ottoman Empire were greatly radicalized. As a result of Ottoman oppression, destruction of monasteries and violence against the non-Muslim civilian population, Serbs and their church leaders headed by Serbian Patriarch Arsenije III sided with Austrians in 1689. In the following punitive campaigns, Ottoman armies conducted many atrocities against local Christian populations in Serb lands, resulting in the Great Migration of the Serbs. Since northern parts of the Patriarchate came under the rule of the Habsburg monarchy during the war (1683–1699), Serbian eparchies in those regions were reorganized into the autonomous Metropolitanate of Krušedol (1708) that remained under supreme ecclesiastical jurisdiction of the Serbian Patriarchate. In 1713, the seat of the Metropolitanate was moved to Sremski Karlovci. In 1718, by the Treaty of Požarevac, some northern and central regions of Serbia were ceded by the Ottomans to the Habsburgs, and in those territories an autonomous Metropolitanate of Belgrade was established, remaining under supreme jurisdiction of Serbian patriarch Mojsije I. In 1731, sees of Karlovci and Belgrade were united, under metropolitan Vikentije Jovanović, but already in 1739, by the Treaty of Belgrade, all Habsburg parts of Serbia were returned to the Ottoman rule, and thus under direct jurisdiction of the Serbian Patriarchs in Peć.

During the Habsburg-Ottoman War (1737-1739), another uprising broke out against the Ottoman rule in various Serb-inhabited regions, headed by Serbian Patriarch Arsenije IV, who sided with the Habsburgs and left Peć for Belgrade. At the same time, the Second Migration of the Serbs was initiated, leading to further weakening of the remaining ecclesiastical structures in Serb lands under the Ottoman rule.

Frequent Serbian uprisings against the Ottomans and involvement of Serbian Patriarchs in anti-Ottoman activities, led to the political incrimination of the Patriarchate in the eyes of the Ottoman political elite. Instead of Serbian bishops, Ottoman authorities favored politically more reliable Greek bishops who were promoted to Serbian eparchies and even to the patriarchal throne in Peć, starting with Joannicius III, who was appointed in 1739. During the following years, and particularly after 1752, a series of internal conflicts arose among leading figures in the Serbian Patriarchate, resulting in constant fights between Serbian and Greek pretenders to the patriarchal throne. The Serbian Patriarchate of Peć collapsed in 1766, when it was abolished by the sultan Mustafa III (1757–1774). The entire territory of the Serbian Patriarchate under Ottoman rule was placed under the jurisdiction of the Ecumenical Patriarchate of Constantinople. The throne of Peć was suppressed and eleven remaining Serbian eparchies were transferred to the throne of Constantinople. Those eparchies were: Eparchy of Belgrade, Eparchy of Dabar and Bosnia, Eparchy of Herzegovina, Eparchy of Kyustendil, Eparchy of Niš, Eparchy of Prizren, Eparchy of Raška, Eparchy of Samokov, Eparchy of Skopje, Eparchy of Užice, and Eparchy of Zvornik.

== See also ==
- Metropolitanate of Karlovci
- Patriarchate of Karlovci
- Serbian Orthodox Church

== Sources ==
- Andrić, Stanko (2016). "Saint John Capistran and Despot George Branković: An Impossible Compromise". Byzantinoslavica. 74 (1–2): 202–227.
- Anscombe, Frederick F. (2014). State, Faith, and Nation in Ottoman and Post-Ottoman Lands. Cambridge: Cambridge University Press. ISBN 9781107729674.
- Bataković, Dušan T., ed. (2005). Histoire du peuple serbe [History of the Serbian People] (in French). Lausanne: L’Age d’Homme. ISBN 978-2-8251-1958-7.
- Ćirković, Sima (2004). The Serbs. Malden: Blackwell Publishing. ISBN 9781405142915.
- Čanak-Medić, Milka; Todić, Branislav (2017). The Monastery of the Patriarchate of Peć. Novi Sad: Platoneum, Beseda. ISBN 9788685869839.
- Cox, John K. (2002). The History of Serbia. Westport, Connecticut: Greenwood Press. ISBN 978-0-313-31290-8.
- Daskalov, Rumen; Marinov, Tchavdar, eds. (2013). Entangled Histories of the Balkans: Volume One: National Ideologies and Language Policies. Leiden-Boston: Brill. ISBN 9789004250765.
- Donia, Robert J.; Fine, John Van Antwerp Jr. (1994). Bosnia and Hercegovina: A Tradition Betrayed. New York: Columbia University Press.
- Fine, John Van Antwerp Jr. (1994) [1987]. The Late Medieval Balkans: A Critical Survey from the Late Twelfth Century to the Ottoman Conquest. Ann Arbor, Michigan: University of Michigan Press. ISBN 0472082604.
- Fine, John Van Antwerp Jr. (2005). When Ethnicity did not Matter in the Balkans: A Study of Identity in Pre-Nationalist Croatia, Dalmatia, and Slavonia in the Medieval and Early-Modern Periods. Ann Arbor, Michigan: University of Michigan Press. ISBN 0472025600.
- Fortescue, Adrian (1907). The Orthodox Eastern Church (1. ed.). London: Catholic Truth Society.
- Fotić, Aleksandar (2008). "Serbian Orthodox Church". Encyclopedia of the Ottoman Empire. New York: Infobase Publishing. pp. 519–520. ISBN 9781438110257.
- Gavrilović, Slavko (1993). "Serbs in Hungary, Slavonia and Croatia in struggles against the Turks (15th–18th centuries)". Serbs in European Civilization. Belgrade: Nova, Serbian Academy of Sciences and Arts, Institute for Balkan Studies. pp. 41–54. ISBN 978-86-7583-015-3.
- Gavrilović, Vladan (2020). "Migrations of Serbian people to the Province of Srem during Austro-Turkish War 1737-1739". The Habsburg State-wide and the regions in the Southern Danube basin (16th-20th centuries). Wien: New Academic Press. pp. 45–55. ISBN 978-3-7003-2199-6.
- Ivić, Pavle, ed. (1995). The History of Serbian Culture. Edgware: Porthill Publishers. ISBN 9781870732314.
- Jelavich, Barbara (1983). History of the Balkans: Eighteenth and Nineteenth Centuries. Vol. 1. Cambridge University Press. ISBN 978-0-521-25249-2.
- Kašić, Dušan, ed. (1965). Serbian Orthodox Church: Its past and present. Vol. 1. Belgrade: Serbian Orthodox Church.
- Kašić, Dušan, ed. (1966). Serbian Orthodox Church: Its past and present. Vol. 2. Belgrade: Serbian Orthodox Church.
- Kašić, Dušan, ed. (1972). Serbian Orthodox Church: Its past and present. Vol. 3. Belgrade: Serbian Orthodox Church.
- Kašić, Dušan, ed. (1973). Serbian Orthodox Church: Its past and present. Vol. 4. Belgrade: Serbian Orthodox Church.
- Kašić, Dušan, ed. (1975). Serbian Orthodox Church: Its past and present. Vol. 5. Belgrade: Serbian Orthodox Church.
- Kašić, Dušan, ed. (1983). Serbian Orthodox Church: Its past and present. Vol. 6. Belgrade: Serbian Orthodox Church.
- Katić, Tatjana (2017). "Administrative Division, Settlements and Demographics in the First Centuries of Ottoman Rule" (PDF). Artistic Heritage of the Serbian People in Kosovo and Metohija: History, Identity, Vulnerability, Protection. Belgrade: Serbian Academy of Sciences and Arts. pp. 41–48.
- Katić, Tatjana; Vučetić, Biljana (2017). "In the time of the Ottoman Empire (1455-1912)" (PDF). Artistic Heritage of the Serbian People in Kosovo and Metohija: History, Identity, Vulnerability, Protection. Belgrade: Serbian Academy of Sciences and Arts. pp. 365–377.
- Kia, Mehrdad (2011). Daily Life in the Ottoman Empire. Santa Barbara, California: Greenwood Press. ISBN 9780313064029.
- Kidd, Beresford James (1927). The Churches of Eastern Christendom: From A.D. 451 to the Present Time. London: Faith Press. ISBN 9780598821126.
- Kiminas, Demetrius (2009). The Ecumenical Patriarchate: A History of Its Metropolitanates with Annotated Hierarch Catalogs. Wildside Press. ISBN 9781434458766.
- Kręzel, Piotr (2022). "The Legal and Fiscal Situation of the Serbs in the Patriarchate of Peć during the First Decades of the 18th Century". Studia Ceranea. 12: 651–666. doi:10.18778/2084-140X.12.23. hdl:11089/45856.
- Kursar, Vjeran (2013). "Non-Muslim Communal Divisions and Identities in the Early Modern Ottoman Balkans and the Millet System Theory". Power and Influence in South-Eastern Europe, 16th-19th century. Berlin: LIT Verlag. pp. 97–108. ISBN 9783643903310.
- Matić, Miljana M. (2016). "Serbian icon painting in the territory under the jurisdiction of the renewed Patriarchate". Sacral Art of the Serbian Lands in the Middle Ages. Belgrade: Institute for Byzantine Studies. pp. 529–539.
- Mileusnić, Slobodan, ed. (1989). Serbian Orthodox Church: Its past and present. Vol. 7. Belgrade: Serbian Orthodox Church.
- Ostrogorsky, George (1956). History of the Byzantine State. Oxford: Basil Blackwell.
- Paizi-Apostolopoulou, Machi (2012). "Appealing to the Authority of a Learned Patriarch: New Evidence on Gennadios Scholarios' Responses to the Questions of George Branković". The Historical Review. 9: 95–116.
- Pavlović, Jovan, ed. (1992). Serbian Orthodox Church: Its past and present. Vol. 8. Belgrade: Serbian Orthodox Church.
- Pavlovich, Paul (1989). The History of the Serbian Orthodox Church. Serbian Heritage Books. ISBN 9780969133124.
- Pavlowitch, Stevan K. (2002). Serbia: The History behind the Name. London: Hurst & Company. ISBN 9781850654773.
- Popović, Mihailo S. (2021). "The Patriarchate and the Churches of the Balkans". A Companion to the Patriarchate of Constantinople. Leiden-Boston: Brill. pp. 151–182.
- Puzović, Predrag (2010). The Serbian Patriarchate: A history of the Serbian Orthodox Church. Novi Sad: Orthodox Word.
- Rakić, Zoran (2016). "Art of the restored Patriarchate of Peć (1557-1690)". Sacral Art of the Serbian Lands in the Middle Ages. Belgrade: Institute for Byzantine Studies. pp. 497–513.
- Roudometof, Victor (2001). Nationalism, Globalization, and Orthodoxy: The Social Origins of Ethnic Conflict in the Balkans. London: Greenwood Press. ISBN 9780313319495.
- Runciman, Steven (1968). The Great Church in Captivity: A Study of the Patriarchate of Constantinople from the Eve of the Turkish Conquest to the Greek War of Independence (1st ed.). Cambridge: Cambridge University Press. ISBN 9780521071888.
- Schwicker, Johann Heinrich (1881). "Die Vereinigung der serbischen Metropolien von Belgrad und Carlowitz im Jahre 1731". Archiv für österreichische Geschichte. 62: 305–450.
- Sotirović, Vladislav B. (2011). "The Serbian Patriarchate of Peć in the Ottoman Empire: The First Phase (1557–94)". Serbian Studies: Journal of the North American Society for Serbian Studies. 25 (2): 143–169. doi:10.1353/ser.2011.0038. S2CID 143629322.
- Šuletić, Nebojša (2017). "Under Ottoman Rule: Until the End of the 18th Century" (PDF). Artistic Heritage of the Serbian People in Kosovo and Metohija: History, Identity, Vulnerability, Protection. Belgrade: Serbian Academy of Sciences and Arts. pp. 31–39.
- Šuletić, Nebojša (2021). "Usurpations of and Designated Successions to the Throne in the Serbian Patriarchate: The Case of Patriarch Moses Rajović (1712-24)" (PDF). Balcanica (52): 47–67. doi:10.2298/BALC2152047S. Archived from the original (PDF) on 17 February 2022.
- Točanac-Radović, Isidora (2018). "Belgrade - Seat of the Archbishopric and Metropolitanate (1718–1739)". Belgrade 1521-1867. Belgrade: The Institute of History. pp. 155–167. ISBN 978-86-7743-132-7.
- Točanac-Radović, Isidora (2022). "The Great Migration of Serbs and the Question of the Serbian Ethnic and Religious Community in the Habsburg Monarchy". Migrations in the Slavic Cultural Space: From the Middle Ages to the Present Day. Łódź: Łódź University Press. pp. 15–27. ISBN 978-83-8331-033-6.
