= Archbishopric of Ohrid =

Balkan Orthodox church (1018–1767)

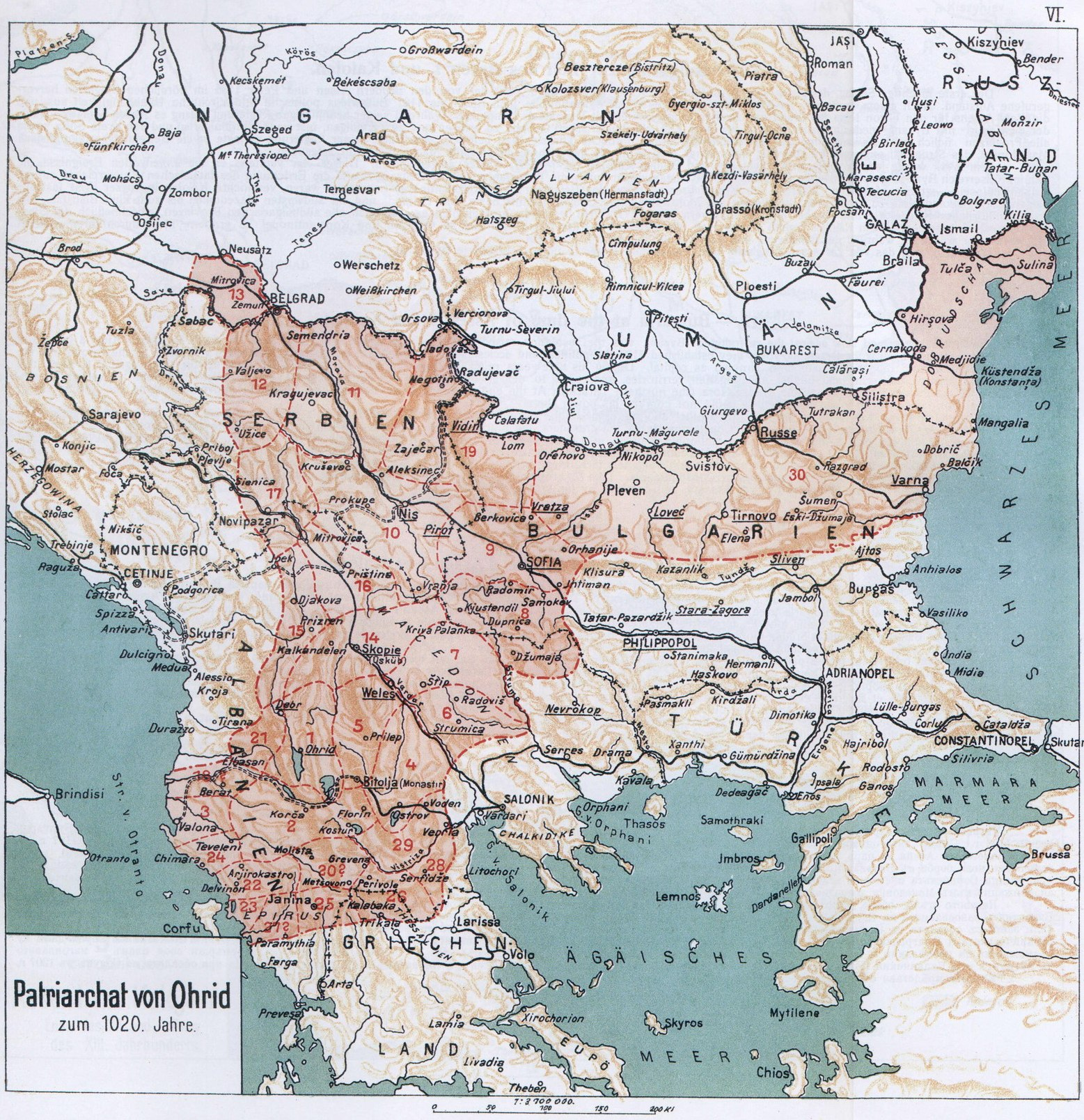
Map depicting the Archbishopric of Ohrid in c. 1020 (1917).

The Archbishopric of Ohrid, also known as the Bulgarian Archbishopric of Ohrid (Bulgarian: Българска Охридска архиепископия; Macedonian: Охридска архиепископија), originally called Archbishopric of Justiniana Prima and all Bulgaria (Greek: ἀρχιεπίσκοπὴ τῆς Πρώτης Ἰουστινιανῆς καὶ πάσης Βουλγαρίας), was an autocephalous Eastern Orthodox church established following the Byzantine conquest of Bulgaria in 1018 by lowering the rank of the autocephalous Bulgarian Patriarchate due to its subjugation to the Byzantines. In 1767, the archbishopric's autocephaly was abolished, and the archbishopric was placed under the tutelage of the Patriarchate of Constantinople.

== Name ==
The initial title of the archbishopric was simply Bulgaria (Greek: Βουλγαρία), but under the famous archbishop Theophylact Hephaistos (1078–1107) it was expanded to All Bulgaria ("Whole Bulgaria") (πᾶσα Βουλγαρία).

John IV (1139/42–1163/64), the cousin of Emperor John II Komnenos, was the first to use the title Archbishop of Justiniana Prima and All Bulgaria (ἀρχιεπίσκοπος Πρώτης Ἰουστινιανῆς καὶ πάσης Βουλγαρίας) in 1157, reflecting a recently developed trend that claimed for the see the succession and prerogatives of the short-lived Archbishopric of Justiniana Prima (535 – c. 610), founded by Justinian I. This title apparently fell into disuse by John's immediate successors, possibly due to pressure from the Patriarchate of Constantinople, but in the early 13th century it was revived by the ambitious Demetrios Chomatenos (1216–1236) to support his claims of quasi-patriarchal status in his clash over authority with the patriarchs of Constantinople in exile at the Empire of Nicaea. The designation finally became accepted by Constantinople and the Byzantine imperial chancery after 1261, and a fixed part of the archbishops' titulature; in the fullest form, the see was hence known as the Archbishopric of Justiniana Prima, Ohrid and all Bulgaria (ἀρχιεπίσκοπὴ Πρώτης Ἰουστινιανῆς Ἀχριδῶν καὶ πάσης Βουλγαρίας).

Archbishopric of Ohrid is the most common term of reference for the see because for the duration of its existence; from 1020 to 1767, its seat was in the city of Ohrid.

== History ==
=== Background ===
Shortly after 934, the Byzantine emperor Romanos I Lekapenos recognized the head of the Bulgarian Orthodox Church, Archbishop Damian, to the rank of patriarch, following the terms of the peace treaty that ended the Byzantine–Bulgarian war of 913–927. In 971, Emperor John I Tzimiskes dismissed Damian after annexing the capital city of Great Preslav and parts of northeast Bulgaria, but the Bulgarian patriarchate was probably restored under Tsar Samuel of Bulgaria. During his rule, the residence of the Bulgarian patriarchs remained closely connected to the developments in the war between Samuel and the Byzantine emperor Basil II. Thus, the next Patriarch German resided consecutively in Moglena (Almopia), Vodena (Edessa) and Prespa. Around 990, the last patriarch, Philip, moved to Ohrid.

=== History ===
Following his final subjugation of the Bulgarian state in 1018, Basil II, to underscore the Byzantine victory, established the Archbishopric of Ohrid by downgrading the Bulgarian patriarchate to the rank of the archbishopric. The now archbishopric remained an autocephalous church, separate from the Patriarchate of Constantinople. However, while the archbishopric was completely independent in any other aspect, its primate was selected by the emperor from a list of three candidates submitted by the local church synod. In three sigillia issued in 1020 Basil II gave extensive privileges to the new see.

Although the first appointed archbishop (John of Debar) was a Bulgarian from Kutmichevitsa, his successors, as well as the whole higher clergy, were invariably Byzantine, the most famous of them being Saint Theophylact (1078–1107). The Archbishops were chosen from among the monks in Constantinople. Adrianos Komnenos, under his monastic name of John (IV) (1143–1160), was the cousin of Emperor John II Komnenos and was the first Archbishop who held the title of Archbishop of Justiniana Prima. The later archbishop John V Kamateros (1183–1216) was a former imperial clerk.

In the 13th and the first half of the 14th centuries, the territory of the archbishopric was contested by the Byzantine Empire, the Latin Empire, the Despotate of Epirus, the Second Bulgarian Empire and later Serbia. After the fall of Constantinople to the Latins in 1204 and with the foundation of the new states on the territory under the jurisdiction of the Ohrid Archbishopric, autonomous churches were founded in the states which did not accept the jurisdiction either of Constantinople or of Ohrid. After 1204, the Empire of Nicaea claimed the Byzantine imperial heritage and provided refuge to the exiled patriarchs of Constantinople. In the restored Second Bulgarian Empire, a new archbishopric was founded with its see in Tarnovo. Tsar Kaloyan (1197–1207) did not succeed in putting the Ohrid Archbishopric under the jurisdiction of the Tarnovo Archbishopric but nevertheless managed to expel the Greek bishops and install Bulgarians instead. The next Bulgarian rulers were constantly trying to reunite the Ohrid Archbishopric with the Tarnovo Archbishopric. The Latin conquests, the restoring of the Bulgarian Empire and the formation of an independent Serbian state reduced the jurisdiction of the Ohrid Archbishopric immensely, but it did not disappear. During the time of Archbishop Demetrios Chomatenos, the autocephaly of the archbishopric was confirmed with the act of anointing the despot of Epirus, Theodore Komnenos Doukas, as Emperor and in correspondence with the Patriarch.

The southward expansion of the Serbian state in the second half of the 13th century was also followed by changes in ecclesiastical jurisdiction of some sees. After the successful Serbian campaigns against the Byzantine empire in 1282–1283, cities of Skopje and Debar were annexed and local eparchies transferred to the jurisdiction of Serbian Archbishopric of Peć.

Serbian expansion reached its apogee at the time of king and tsar Stefan Dušan (1331–1355). Dušan had conquered Ohrid around 1334. Under Serbian rule the Archbishopric of Ohrid kept its autonomy. On 16 April 1346 (Easter), at the Serbian capital city of Skopje, a joined state and church assembly (Sabor) was held, attended by Serbian Archbishop Joanikije II, the Archbishop Nicholas I of Ohrid, the Patriarch Simeon of Bulgaria and other hierarchs and dignitaries, including monastic leaders of Mount Athos. The assembly proclaimed the raising of the autocephalous Serbian Archbishopric to the rank of Patriarchate. The Archbishopric of Ohrid was not annexed to the Serbian Patriarchate of Peć and kept its autonomy, recognizing only the honorary seniority of the Serbian Patriarch.

After the Battle of Maritsa in 1371, and Battle of Kosovo in 1389, much of the territory of the Archbishopric of Ohrid was affected by the expansion of Ottoman Turks, who conquered Skopje in 1392 and annexed all southern regions after the death of Prince Marko in 1395. The archbishopric managed to survive the transition and was legalized by new Ottoman authorities. Not long after the fall of the Bulgarian Patriarchate in 1393, some of the bishoprics under its jurisdiction also entered the Ohrid Archbishopric. Thus, at the beginning of the 15th century, the Archbishop of Ohrid, attached the dioceses of Sofia and Vidin to the archbishopric. In 1408, Ohrid came under Ottoman rule. Still, the Ottomans did not reach after the Ohrid Archbishopric, mostly because of their tolerance for monotheistic religions, and left the people to govern themselves regarding religion.

When the last medieval Serbian Patriarch died in 1463, there were no technical options to elect a new one, so the Ohrid Archbishopric had laid its claim over many of the Serbian Patriarchate's eparchies on the basis of its old 1019 territorial rights, predating Serbian autocephaly. By the 1520s, the Archbishopric of Ohrid had managed to put practically the entire Serbian Church under its jurisdiction, however, by the intervention of Sokollu Mehmed Pasha in 1557, the latter was renewed and reorganized. During the 15th century, dioceses from the other side of the Danube, from the duchies of Wallachia and Moldova, fell under the jurisdiction of the archbishopric. Nevertheless, this did not last for more than a hundred years. Towards the beginning of the 16th century, the Ohrid Archbishopric expanded its jurisdiction even over territories in Southern Italy, as well as in Dalmatia. The flock of this diocese was made of Greeks and Albanians. Towards the middle of the 16th century, the Ohrid Archbishopric lost the Diocese of Veroia, however, at the beginning of the 17th century, it gained the Diocese of Durazzo from the Ecumenical Patriarchate of Constantinople. Since then and until its abolishment in 1767, the archbishopric neither lost nor gained a diocese under its jurisdiction.

=== Abolition ===
The autocephaly of the Ohrid Archbishopric remained respected during the periods of Byzantine, Bulgarian, Serbian and Ottoman rule; the church continued to exist until its abolition in 1767, when it was abolished by the Sultan's decree, at the urging of the Greek Eastern Orthodox leaders of Istanbul, and was placed under the jurisdiction of the Patriarch of Constantinople. The division into phanariotes and autochthonists which occurred among the diocesan bishops of the Ohrid Archbishopric and, the difficult financial position of the Ohrid Archbishopric over a longer period of time, contributed to its abolishment. Just a year before, the Patriarchate of Constantinople abolished the Serbian Patriarchate of Peć in the same manner, and its dioceses adjoined to the Patriarchate of Constantinople.

== Language ==
The Greek language quite early replaced Old Church Slavonic as the official language of the archbishopric. All documents and even hagiographies of saints, for example the hagiography of Clement of Ohrid, were written in Greek. Despite this, the Slavonic liturgy was preserved on the lower levels of the church for several centuries.

== Administration ==
The Archbishopric of Ohrid was an autocephalous church, with full internal ecclesiastical self-governance. Only after the Ottoman conquest, as part of the millet system, did it come under the supreme ecclesiastical jurisdiction of the Ecumenical Patriarchate of Constantinople.

At the time of its establishment, the archbishopric comprised 32 suffragan sees. However, over the following decades many of the bishoprics removed from other jurisdictions and accorded to Ohrid by Basil II were returned to their original metropolises. Despite the creation of new bishoprics from existing ones, by the middle of the 12th century the number of suffragans—apart from Ohrid itself—had decreased to 23 (modern names in parentheses): Kastoria, Skopia (Skopje), Belebousdion (Velbazhd), Sardike or Triaditza (Sofia), Malesobe or Morobisdion (unlocated), Edessa or Moglena, Herakleia (Bitola) or Pelagonia, Prisdiana, Tiberioupolis or Stroummitza (Strumica), Nisos, Kephalonia or Glabinitze, Morabos or Branichevo, Sigida or Belegrada (Belgrade), Bidine (Vidin), Sirmion (Sremska Mitrovica), Lipenion, Rhasos (Ras), Selasphoros or Diabolis (Devol), Slanitza or Pella, Illyrikon or Kanina, Grebenon (Grevena), Drastar (Silistra), Deure (Debar), and the Vreanoti (Vranje), called also "bishopric of the Vlachs".

== See also ==
- Archbishop of Ohrid
- Charters of Emperor Basil II on the rights of the Ohrid Archbishopric
- Macedonian Orthodox Church
- Bulgarian Orthodox Church
- Serbian Orthodox Church
  - Orthodox Ohrid Archbishopric
- Roman Catholic Archdiocese of Ohrid
- Archbishopric of Justiniana Prima

== Sources ==
- Ćirković, Sima (2004). The Serbs. Malden: Blackwell Publishing. ISBN 9781405142915.
- Dragojlović, Dragoljub (1991). "Archevéché d'Ohrid dans la hiérarchie des grandes églises chrétiennes" (PDF). Balcanica (22): 43–55.
- Fine, John V. A. Jr. (1991) [1983]. The Early Medieval Balkans: A Critical Survey from the Sixth to the Late Twelfth Century. Ann Arbor: University of Michigan Press. ISBN 0-472-08149-7.
- Fine, John V. A. (1994) [1987]. The Late Medieval Balkans: A Critical Survey from the Late Twelfth Century to the Ottoman Conquest. Ann Arbor, Michigan: University of Michigan Press. ISBN 978-0-472-10079-8.
- Fortescue, Adrian (1908). The Orthodox Eastern Church. London: Catholic Truth Society.
- Gelzer, Heinrich (1902). Der Patriarchat von Achrida: Geschichte und Urkunden. Leipzig: Teubner.
- Iliev, Iliya (2011). "The First Two Centuries of the Archbishopric of Ohrid". In V. Gjuzelev; K. Petkov (eds.). State and Church: Studies in Medieval Bulgaria and Byzantium. Sofia: American Research Center in Sofia. pp. 237–259. ISBN 9789549257120.
- Vraniskovski, Jovan (2007). Brief History of the Ohrid Archbishpric. Ohrid: Ohrid Archbishopric and Metropolitanate of Skopje. ISBN 9788684799274.
- Kiminas, Demetrius (2009). The Ecumenical Patriarchate: A History of Its Metropolitanates with Annotated Hierarch Catalogs. Wildside Press LLC. ISBN 9781434458766.
- Komatina, Predrag (2023). "The diocesan structure of the Archbishopric of Ohrid in the charters of Basil II: Historical development until the early 11th century" (PDF). Зборник радова Византолошког института. 60: 7–25. Archived from the original (PDF) on 2024-04-07.
- Nesbitt, John; Oikonomides, Nicolas, eds. (1991). Catalogue of Byzantine Seals at Dumbarton Oaks and in the Fogg Museum of Art, Volume 1: Italy, North of the Balkans, North of the Black Sea. Vol. 1. Washington, DC: Dumbarton Oaks Research Library and Collection. ISBN 0-88402-194-7.
- Nicol, Donald M. (1993) [1972]. The Last Centuries of Byzantium, 1261–1453 (Second ed.). Cambridge: Cambridge University Press. ISBN 978-0-521-43991-6.
- Obolensky, Dimitri (1974) [1971]. The Byzantine Commonwealth: Eastern Europe, 500-1453. London: Cardinal. ISBN 9780351176449.
- Ostrogorsky, George (1956). History of the Byzantine State. Oxford: Basil Blackwell.
- Prinzing, Günter (1978). "Entstehung und Rezeption der Justiniana-Prima-Theorie im Mittelalter". Byzantinobulgarica (in German). 5: 269–287.
- Prinzing, Günter (2012). "The autocephalous Byzantine ecclesiastical province of Bulgaria/Ohrid: How independent were its archbishops?". Bulgaria Mediaevalis. 3: 355–383. Archived from the original on 2026-04-20.
- Prinzing, Günter (2012b). "Convergence and divergence between the Patriarchal Register of Constantinople and the Ponemata Diaphora of Archbishop Demetrios Chomatenos of Achrida/Ohrid" (PDF). Византијски свет на Балкану. Vol. 1. Београд: Византолошки институт. pp. 1–17.
- Runciman, Steven (1968). The Great Church in Captivity: A Study of the Patriarchate of Constantinople from the Eve of the Turkish Conquest to the Greek War of Independence (1. ed.). Cambridge: Cambridge University Press. ISBN 9780521071888.
- Snegarov, I. (1924). История на Охридската архиепископия 1. От основаването ѝ до завладяването на Балканския полуостров от турците (in Bulgarian). Sofia.
- Soulis, George Christos (1984). The Serbs and Byzantium during the reign of Tsar Stephen Dušan (1331-1355) and his successors. Washington: Dumbarton Oaks Library and Collection. ISBN 9780884021377.
- Stanković, Vlada, ed. (2016). The Balkans and the Byzantine World before and after the Captures of Constantinople, 1204 and 1453. Lanham, Maryland: Lexington Books. ISBN 9781498513265.
