= Pahomije Gačić =

His Eminence Pahomije (Pachomius)
- Bishop of Vranje from 2024 Archbichop and Metropolitan
- Native name: Tomislav
- Church: Serbian Orthodox Church
- Diocese: Eparchy of Vranje
- See: Vranje
- Elected: 28 May 1992
- Predecessor: Sava Andrić

Personal details
- Born: Tomislav Gačić; 17 October 1952 (age 74) Čečava near Teslić, PR Bosnia and Herzegovina, FPR Yugoslavia
- Denomination: Serbian Orthodox
- Residence: Vranje (South Serbia)
- Parents: Novak Gačić; Vasilija
- Profession: theologian
- Education: Faculty of Theology of the University of Athens

Ordination history of Pahomije Gačić
History
Diaconal ordination
- Ordained by: Pavle, bishop of Raška and Prizren
Priestly ordination
- Ordained by: Pavle, bishop of Raška and Prizren
Episcopal consecration
- Consecrated by: Patriarch Paul and several other bishops

Pahomije Gačić (born Tomislav Gačić, 17 October 1952) is a Serbian Orthodox cleric who was elected Bishop of Vranje in 1992.

== Biography ==
=== Origin and education ===
Tomislav Gačić was born on 17 October 1952 in the village of Čečava near Teslić (at the time PR Bosnia and Herzegovina, FPR Yugoslavia — today Republic of Bosnia and Herzegovina) to his father Novak Gačić and mother Vasilija. At the age of twenty, he was a novice at the Ozren Monastery and the Visoki Dečani Monastery, where he became a monk in 1973 and received the monastic name Pahomije (Pachomius). The following year, the Bishop of Raška-Prizren, later Serbian Patriarch Pavel, ordained him to the rank of deacon. After completing the seminary in Prizren, he went to the Faculty of Theology in Athens at the University of Athens in 1976, where he graduated in 1980. In the same year, the Bishop of Pakrac-Slavonia Emilijan ordained him to the rank of hieromonk, i.e. priest-monk, at the Vavedenje Monastery in Belgrade.

He then spent two years traveling through Palestine, Sinai, Egyptian monasteries, Mount Athos, Russia, and Japan, while continuing his studies. In 1982, he became the abbot of the Banje Monastery by Priboj in the Metropolitanate of Dabar and Bosnia, in 1984 the abbot of the Grgeteg Monastery on Fruška Gora in the Eparchy of Srem, and in 1985 he was appointed abbot of the Papraće Monastery in Bosnia, in the Eparchy of Zvornik and Tuzla.

=== Vladika (Bishop) ===
On 28 May 1992, he was elected Bishop of Vranje. By decree of the Synod of Bishops of the Serbian Orthodox Church, his narečenije (proclamation) took place on 22 August 1992 in the Prohor Pčinjski Monastery, and his episcopal consecration and enthronement took place the following day, 23 August, in the Cathedral of the Holy Trinity in Vranje. In addition to Patriarch Paul, the co-consecrators were Metropolitan Amfilohije of Montenegro and the Littoral, Bishop Irenaeus of Niš and later Patriarch Irenaeus, Bishop Hrizostom of Banat, Bishop Athanasius of Zahumlje and Herzegovina, Bishop Artemije of Raška and Prizren, and Bishop Justin of Eparchy of Timok. After the then Vicar of Tetovo and administrator of the Macedonian Church under Serbian administration in Macedonia, Jovan Mladenović, was elected as the Western American bishop in 1994, Bishop Pachomius became the administrator of all these dioceses in the Republic of Macedonia. Despite the difficult circumstances in the midst of the church schism, he took care of the development of these church communities.

=== Iguman (Abbot) ===
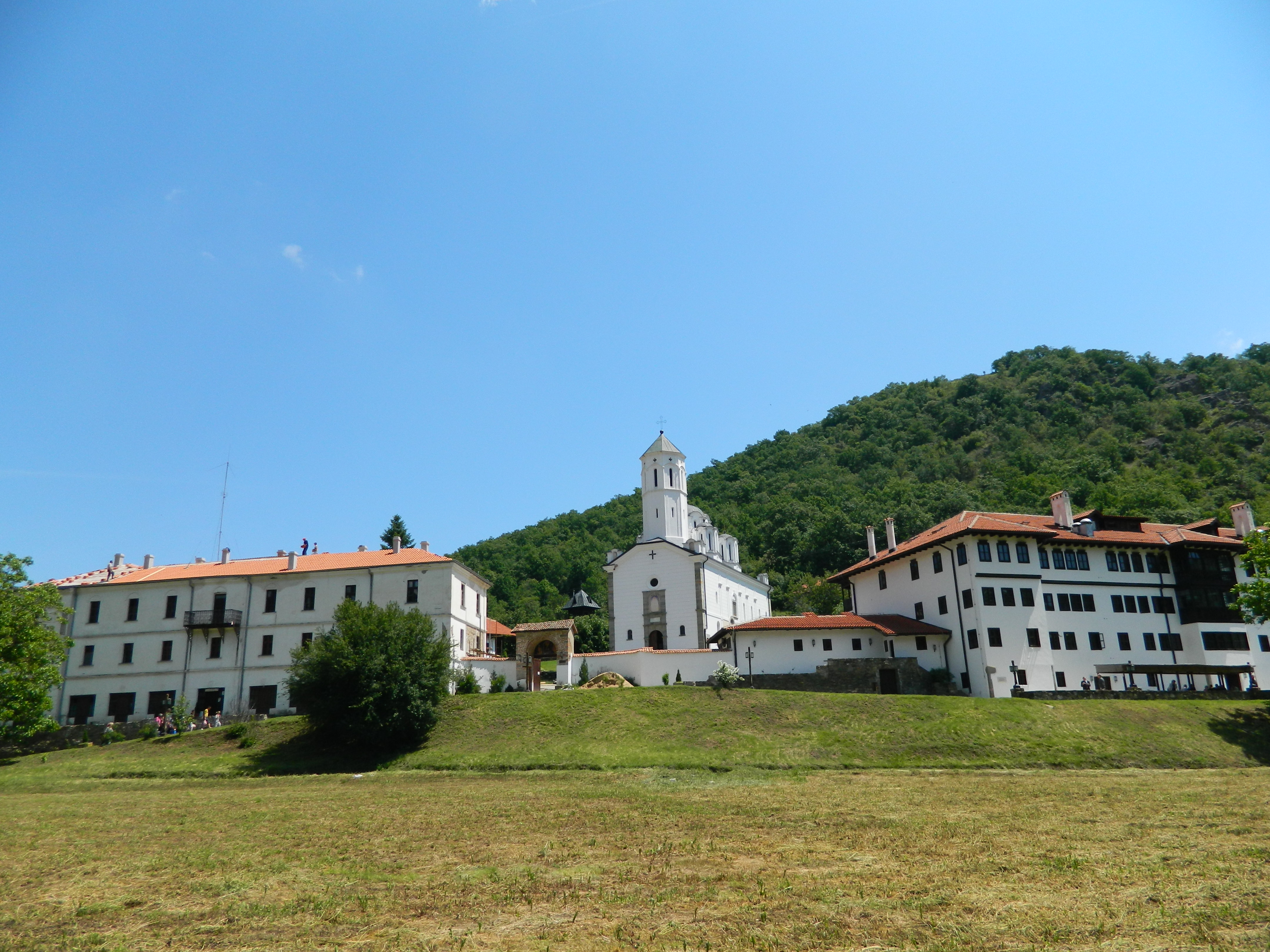
"The Venerable Prohor Pčinjski Monastery" near Vranje

During his staying in Vranje, Pachomius was not only a bishop, but also the abbot (iguman) of the Prohor Pčinjski Monastery three times: 1994–1999, 2003–2004, 2009–2011, and then from 2024 to the present (2026). During this time, the monastery changed from a women's to a men's monastery, and vice versa. Commentators say that these sudden and unusual changes occurred because Pahomije often had disputes with the nuns and simply drove them out of the monastery.

The feast day of "Venerable Prohor Pčinjski" is 1 November. His monastery celebrated two great anniversaries in 2020: the 950th anniversary of the monastery's founding and the 700th anniversary of its restoration. Believers love to visit this ancient monastery building with its church and friendly staff; not rare say that upon entering the monastery grounds, even the greatest worries disappear and their hearts are filled with heavenly peace.

At the "slava" ("feast of the monastery's patron saint") of the monastery in 2023, Pahomije, in the presence of several bishops, abbots, abbotesses, and believers, stated that the renovated monastery looked the most beautiful in its history; he thanked the authorities for their support, especially President Vučić, who had generously personally contributed to the restoration of this sanctuary, which is important not only for the church, but also for the people and the state.

== See also ==
- Serbian Orthodox Church
- Eparchies and metropolitanates of the Serbian Orthodox Church
- Prohor Pčinjski Monastery
- Hague Protection of Minors Convention

Eastern Orthodox Church titles
Preceded by Sava Andrić	Bishop of Vranje; 1992–present	Incumbent
