= Eparchy of Vranje =

Diocese of the Serbian Orthodox Church

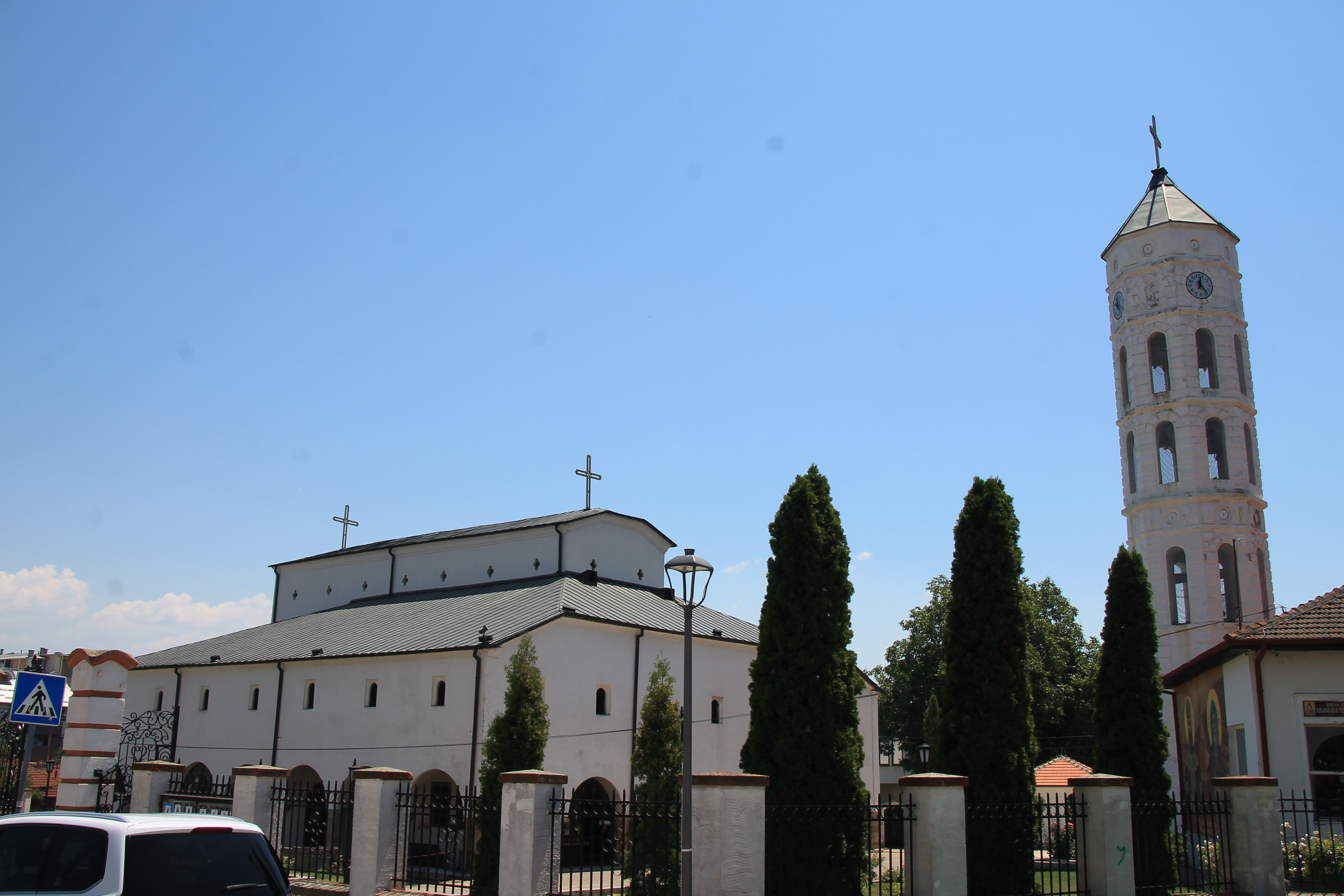
- Holy Trinity Cathedral, Vranje

Location
- Territory: Pčinja District
- Headquarters: Vranje, Serbia

Information
- Denomination: Eastern Orthodox
- Sui iuris church: Serbian Orthodox Church
- Established: 1975
- Cathedral: Holy Trinity Cathedral, Vranje
- Language: Church Slavonic, Serbian

Current leadership
- Bishop: Pahomije Gačić

Map

Website
- Eparchy of Vranje

Eparchy of Vranje (Serbian: Епархија врањска, romanized: Eparhija vranjska) is a diocese (eparchy) of the Serbian Orthodox Church, covering southernmost part of Serbia (Pčinja District).

The episcopal see is located at the Holy Trinity Cathedral, Vranje. Its headquarters and bishop's residence are also in Vranje.

== List of bishops ==
- Domentijan Pavlović (1978–1983)
- Sava Andrić (1983–1992)
- Pahomije Gačić (1992–present)

== Notable monasteries ==
- Prohor Pčinjski

== Gallery ==
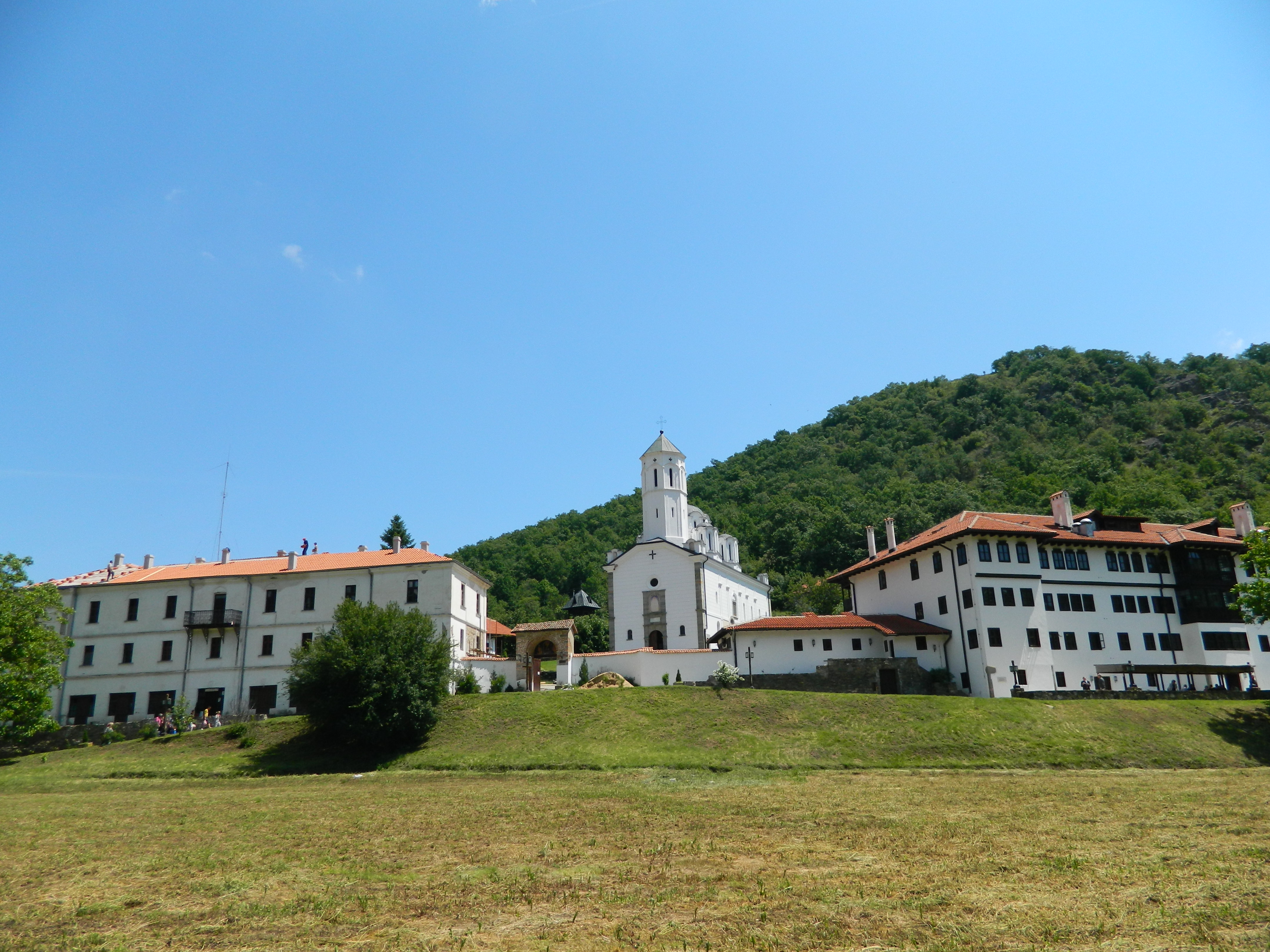
Prohor Pčinjski Monastery

== See also ==
- Eparchies and metropolitanates of the Serbian Orthodox Church
