= Jovan Vraniškovski =

Macedonian cleric (born 1966)

His Eminence Jovan
- Metropolitan of Kruševo and Demir Hisar
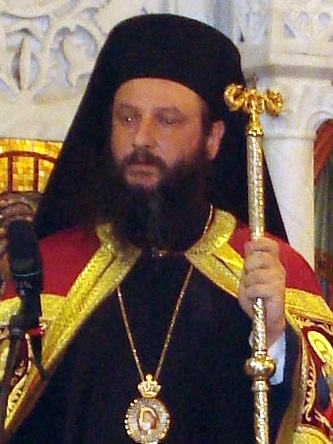
- Vraniškovski in 2011
- Native name: Јован Вранишкоски
- Church: Macedonian Orthodox Church
- Previous posts: Bishop of Dremvitsa (1998-2000) | Metropolitan of Veles and Vardar valley (2000-2005) | Archbishop of Skopje (Orthodox Ohrid Archbishopric) (2005-2023)

Orders
- Ordination: 8 February 1998
- Consecration: 19 July 1998

Personal details
- Born: Zoran Vraniškovski; 28 February 1966 (age 60) Bitola, SFR Yugoslavia
- Denomination: Eastern Orthodoxy
- Education: Civil engineering, theology
- Alma mater: University of Belgrade

Jovan Vraniškovski (Serbian and Macedonian: Јован Вранишковски; born 28 February 1966), is a Macedonian Orthodox cleric. His current title is Metropolitan Jovan of Kruševo and Demir Hisar of the Macedonian Orthodox Church. He was formerly known as Jovan VI, Metropolitan of Skopje and the Archbishop of Ohrid, as the former head of the Orthodox Ohrid Archbishopric (2005–2023).

== Life ==
He was born in Bitola, SR Macedonia, SFR Yugoslavia, on 28 February 1966 and christened as Zoran Vraniškovski. Vraniškovski graduated from the Faculty of Civil Engineering in Skopje in 1990 and graduated from University of Belgrade's Faculty of Orthodox Theology in 1995. He started his master's studies in the same year and later completed his doctoral dissertation called "The Unity of the Church and the Contemporary Ecclesiological Problems". Vraniškovski was named a monk with the name Jovan (John) in February 1998. In 1998, he was consecrated as a bishop with the title Bishop of Dremvitsa and assigned to be a vicar of the Bishop of Prespa and Pelagonia. In March 2000, he was elected as Bishop of the diocese of Veles.

=== Orthodox Ohrid Archbishopric ===
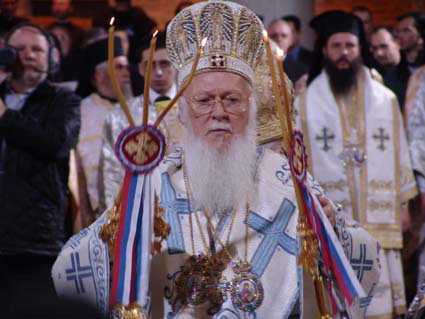
Patriarch Bartholomew and Vraniškovski in 2004

Some Macedonian bishops sought to reconcile their differences with the Serbian Orthodox Church (SOC) and negotiated regarding the status of the Macedonian Orthodox Church (MOC), which had separated from SOC since its self-declared autocephaly in 1967. These negotiations led to an agreement that was signed in Niš in May 2002 - the Niš Agreement. The agreement was signed by three bishops of both delegations. It was supposed to grant MOC autonomous status. The signing of the document caused an uproar in Macedonia (now North Macedonia). The Macedonian bishops attempted to defend it for a short time. It was soon rejected by the Synod of MOC. The Serbian patriarch Pavle invited all MOC's bishops, clergy, monastics and faithful people to enter into liturgical and canonical unity with the Serbian Orthodox Church. Vraniškovski and all priests of Veles agreed to respond to this call, and all signed a document of agreement. Vraniškovski was the only metropolitan to accept the invitation.

A few days after entering into liturgical and canonical unity with the Serbian Orthodox Church, Vraniškovski was expelled from the seat of the Metropolitanate together with the monastic community living with him. The Macedonian media and clergy labeled him a "traitor", a "Serbian servant" and a "fool". Since then, Vraniškovski had been subject to persistent persecution by Macedonian authorities. In 2003, he was sentenced to five days' imprisonment for "disturbance of public peace and order and resisting a police officer", after attempting to perform a baptism in a church run by the Macedonian Orthodox Church. In December 2003, he was elected as the head of the Holy Synod of the Orthodox Ohrid Archbishopric.

In January 2004, Vraniškovski and a dozen of his followers were arrested by the police. Amnesty International found him to be a prisoner of conscience. The US Mission to the OSCE in its February 2004 report stated: "The United States is concerned that Vraniskoski's January detention and his ongoing trial may be disproportionate to his alleged offenses and violate his freedom of religion. We believe that governments should avoid involvement in religious disputes." He was sentenced to 18 months in prison for "instigation of ethnic and religious hatred, discord and intolerance." The verdict stated the conviction relied on three points:

1. He wrote a text in a religious calendar in which he slandered the Macedonian Orthodox Church.
2. He agreed to be appointed as an Exarch of the Ohrid Archbishopric in Macedonia and participated in the ordination of the bishops Joachim and Marko.
3. He officiated at a religious service in an apartment owned by his parents.

The Commission of the Churches in International Affairs of the World Council of Churches summarized his case as being based on "unfounded charges" in which the defendant was denied the "basic right to defense." The European Union also criticized his sentencing, considering his case a violation of freedom of conscience. Commission on Security and Cooperation in Europe reported that Macedonian officials, in response to the ecclesiastical dispute concerning the status of the Macedonian Orthodox Church, have over-reacted and found the 18-month prison sentence to be excessive and unjustified. The Holy Community of the Mount Athos sent a letter of support to him, signed by all Representatives and Abbots who are in the common Assembly of the twenty Holy Monasteries of the Holy Mount Athos. The Orthodox churches reacted upon his imprisonment and appealed for his release. Ecumenical Patriarch Bartholomew I of Constantinople sent a letter to the Prime Minister of the Republic of Macedonia, requesting his immediate release. Reporting about the imprisonment, Freedom House wrote that "the charge was loosely based on the fact that he had performed a baptism and held church services in his apartment. Amnesty International has declared him a prisoner of conscience."

In 2005, the Serbian Orthodox Church appointed him as Archbishop of Ohrid and Metropolitan of Skopje. He was imprisoned on 26 July 2005 and served 220 days in prison before the Supreme Court declared the last two of these three points to be unconstitutional and his sentence was shortened to 8 months. On 27 July 2005, he was sentenced to two years and a half in prison due to "defaming the Macedonian Orthodox church and harming the religious feelings of local citizens." He had distributed Serbian Orthodox church calendars and pamphlets. Patriarch Alexy II of Moscow sent a letter to the President of the Republic of Macedonia, demanding his immediate release. The Standing Conference of the Canonical Orthodox Bishops in the Americas condemned his imprisonment and asked for his release. In the same year, Vraniškovski and other members of the Orthodox Ohrid Archbishopric have been physically attacked on a number of occasions and the churches they have built or used have been destroyed. In Freedom House's 2005 publication, the increase of harassment of leaders of various religious groups was cited as a reason for Macedonia receiving a downward trend arrow.

In 2006, Vraniškovski was again tried and sentenced to two years on charges of embezzlement of a donation of 57,000 euros. Initially, the Court refuted the indictment, but the Court of Appeal returned the case for a retrial. The Holy Synod Of Hierarchs of the Church of Greece expressed a severe protest for an emergent release of him from prison, and for respect of religious freedom in the Republic of Macedonia. In the second trial, the defendants were acquitted of the indictment, but the Court of Appeal returned the case for a third trial. On the third trial both defendants were found guilty, and as a second defendant, Vraniškovski was sentenced to two years' imprisonment, where the first defendant was sentenced to 1 year and 3 months imprisonment. He was imprisoned on 8 August 2006 and served 256 days before being released.

Vraniškovski faced a detainment order for a third retrial of a third case in which the Veles Trial Court initially acquitted him in April 2006 on charges of embezzling 324,000 euros from MOC funds while he was a bishop with the MOC. Metropolitan Herman of the Orthodox Church in America called for his release. The case was returned to the Veles Trial Court for retrial by the Court of Appeals in Skopje, and he was acquitted for a second time in April 2007. On 14 November 2007, the Court of Appeals in Skopje returned this case to the Veles Trial Court for a third trial. Vraniškovski's attorney claimed that neither he nor Vraniškovski was asked to appear in court to testify in the case. Freedom House, speaking of his imprisonment, reported that he has been again arrested for his ties to the Serbian Orthodox Church. On 17 March 2008, the Veles court issued a detention order for Vraniškovski for failing to appear in court. In October 2009, a court in Bitola sentenced him in absentia for the charge of embezzling money while serving as a cleric in Macedonia. In December 2010, Bulgarian authorities detained him as he was transiting the country. He was arrested by the Macedonian police at the Medžitlija border crossing with Greece in December 2011. In July 2013, he was sentenced to three years in prison by the Skopje Criminal Court for embezzling money from MOC. The Conference of European Churches urged Macedonia to release him. Two Macedonian bishops have called for his immediate pardoning in 2014. He was released on parole in 2015. After the reconciliation between the Macedonian Orthodox Church and the Serbian Orthodox Church, the Orthodox Ohrid Archbishopric was dissolved in 2023 and he became the Metropolitan of Kruševo and Demir Hisar in MOC.

=== Personal life and views ===
In a 2020 interview, he said that the Macedonian Orthodox Church is not taking good care of the churches and monasteries founded by Serbian rulers and that many are in a poor state. He characterized the behavior of the MOC as "irresponsible". In 2021, he was vaccinated against the COVID-19 virus and he emphasized the importance of vaccination.

Macedonian Orthodox Church titles
| Preceded by Agatangel Stankovski | Bishop of Veles and Povardarie; 2000 – 2005; Broke away from the Macedonian Church and joined the Serbian Orthodox Church in 2002. | Succeeded by Agatangel Stankovski |
Serbian Orthodox Church titles
| Vacant Archbishopric reestablished Title last held by Dositej Stojković | Archbishop of Ohrid and Metropolitan of Skopje; 2005 – 2023 | Office abolished |
Macedonian Orthodox Church titles
| New title | Metropolitan Bishop of Kruševo and Demir Hisar; 2023 – | Incumbent |
