= Banjane =

Banjane Бањане
- Village
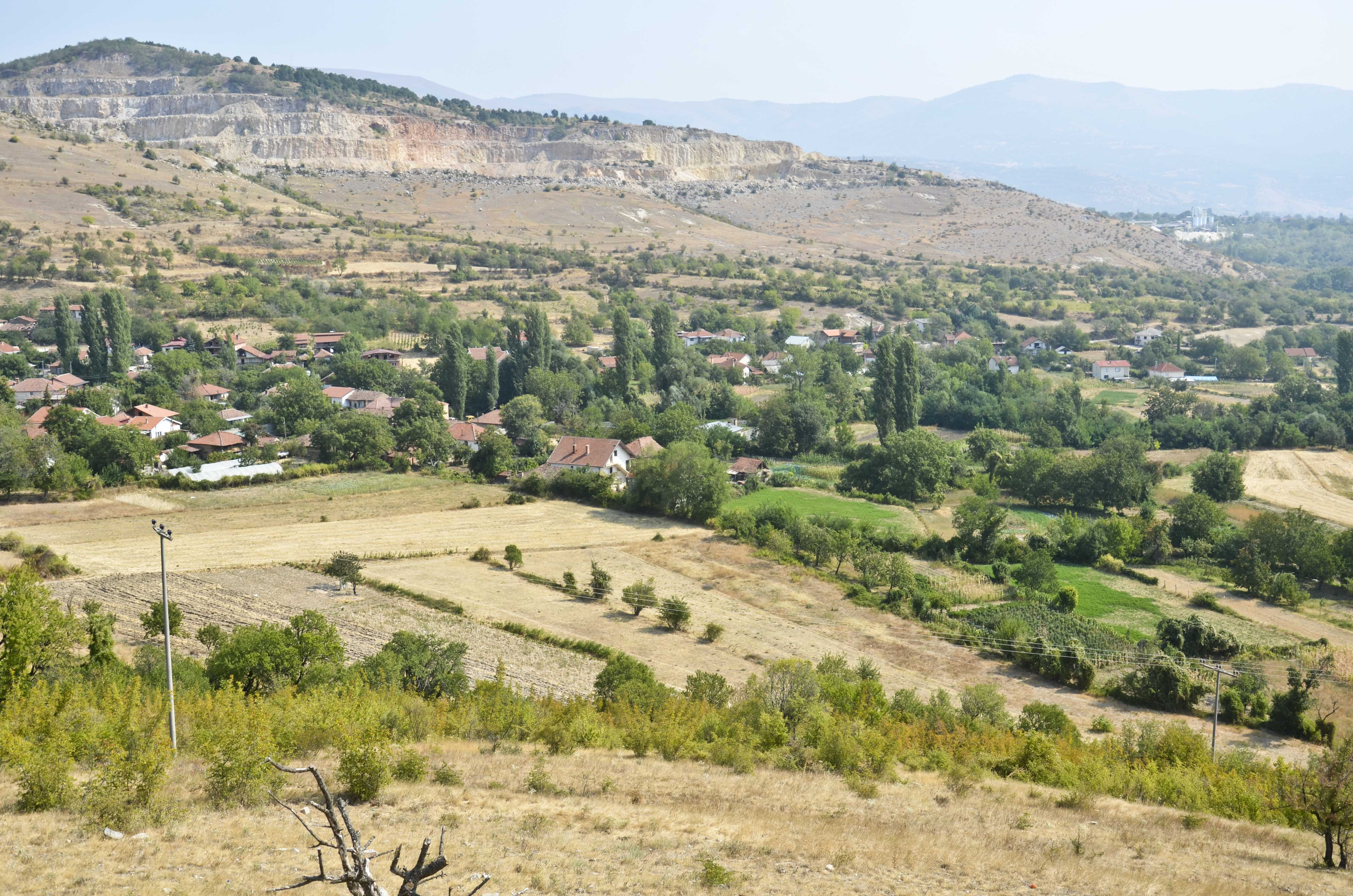
- View of the village

- Location within North Macedonia
- Country: North Macedonia
- Region: Skopje
- Municipality: Čučer-Sandevo

Population (2021)
  - Total: 527
- Time zone: UTC+1 (CET)
  - Summer (DST): UTC+2 (CEST)
- Website: .

Banjane (Macedonian: Бањане) or Banjani (Serbian: Бањани) is a village in the municipality of Čučer-Sandevo, North Macedonia. The village lies some 15 kilometers north of Skopje, in the region of Skopska Crna Gora. Banjane is best known for its three churches, St. Nicetas and St. Elias from 14th century and St. George from 16th century.

== Geography and location ==
The village is located in the northern part of the Skopje Valley, on the territory of the Municipality of Cucer-Sandevo, below the southwestern slope of Skopska Crna Gora. The village is hilly, at an altitude of 500 metres (1,600 ft). The village is 15 km (9.3 mi) away from the city of Skopje.

The area is rich in forests and pastures in the north, and in the south there is arable land. The Banjane River also passes through it. The locals were supplied with drinking water from wells, pumps and fountains.

Surrounding villages are Gornjane and Čučer-Sandevo from the west, Kučevište from the east and Gluvo/Brazda from the south.

== Economy ==
The area of the village is large and covers an area of 15 km^{2} (5.8 sq mi). It is dominated by forests with an area of 1,915.1 hectares (4,732 acres), 301.1 hectares (744 acres) fall to pastures, and 153 hectares (380 acres) to arable land.

The village basically has a mixed agricultural function.

== Demographics ==
According to the statistics of the Bulgarian ethnographer Vasil Kanchov from 1900, 400 inhabitants lived in the village of Banjane, all Bulgarians.

According to the Secretary of the Bulgarian Exarchate Dimitar Mišev ("La Macédoine et sa Population Chrétienne"), in 1905 there were 600 Bulgarians in Banjane, labelled by him as Serbomans (patriarchs).

In his 1927 map of Macedonia, German explorer Leonhard Schultze-Jena shows Banjani as a Serbian village.

In 1961 the village had 687 inhabitants, of which 382 were Macedonians and 293 Serbs, while in 1994 it had 563 inhabitants, of which 324 were Serbs, 221 Macedonians and 8 Romani.

According to the 2002 census, the village had a total of 597 inhabitants. Ethnic groups in the village include:

- Serbs 288
- Macedonians 294
- Romani 9
- Others 5

As of the 2021 census, Banjane had 527 residents with the following ethnic composition:

- Macedonians 255
- Serbs 215
- Persons for whom data are taken from administrative sources 50
- Others 7
