= Church of St. Nicetas, Banjane =

Church in North Macedonia

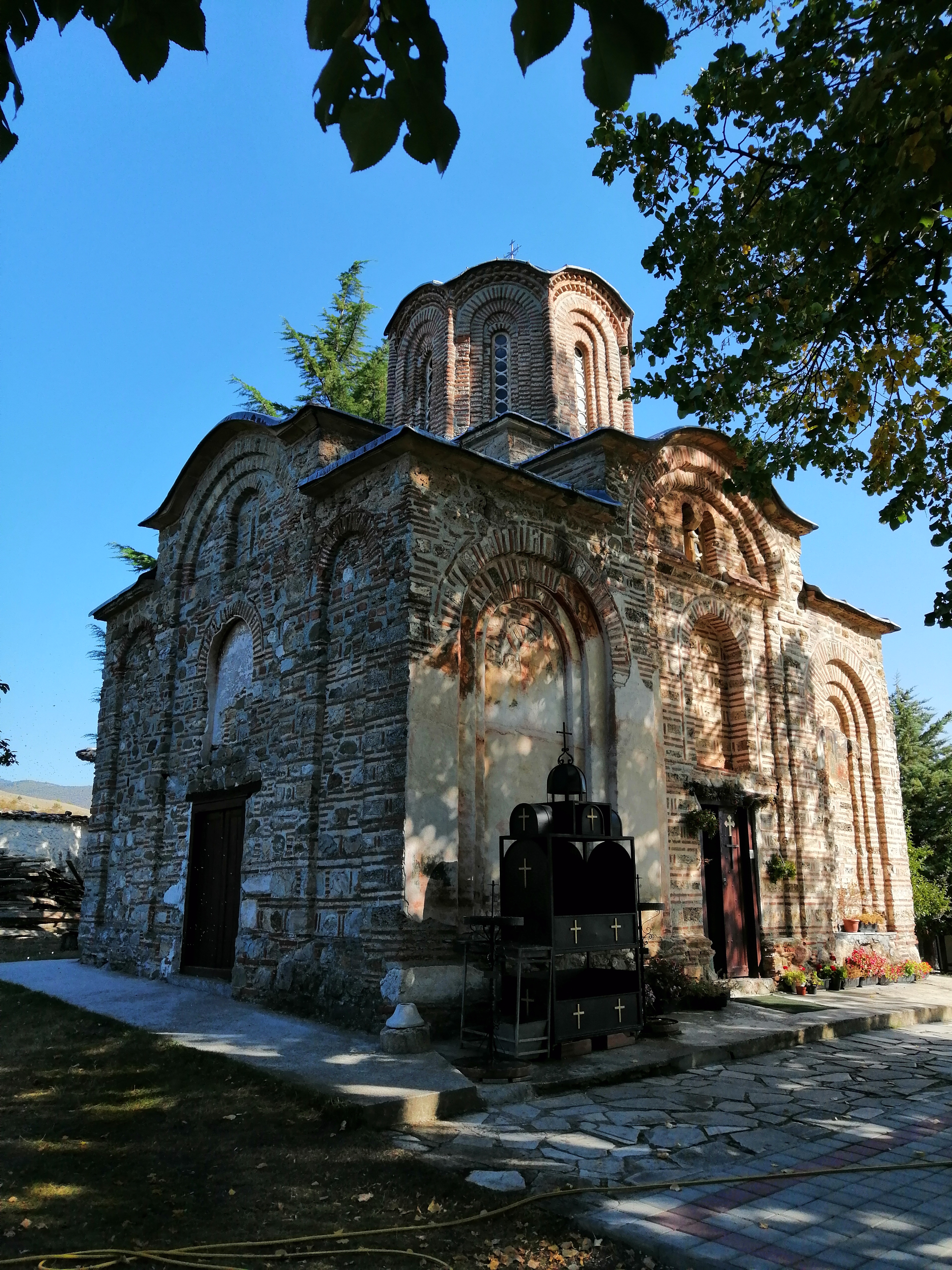
Saint Nicetas in Banjane

Church of Saint Nicetas in Banjane (Macedonian and Serbian Cyrillic: Свети Никита) is a medieval Eastern Orthodox church in the village of Banjane, midway between this and the villages of Čučer-Sandevo and Gornjane (thus it is also often referred to as Saint Nicetas in Čučer). The church and all the villages are a part of Čučer-Sandevo municipality, North Macedonia. The church nowadays belongs to the Skopje diocese of the Ohrid Archbishopric.

== History ==
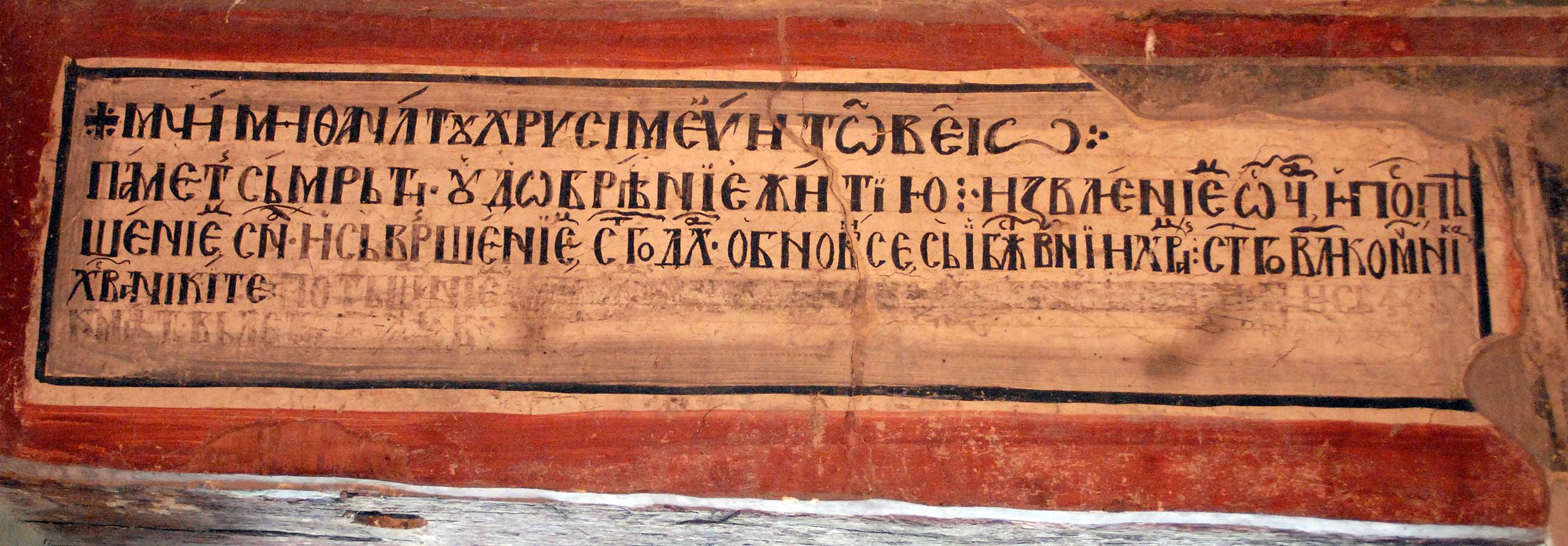
The early 14th century founders' inscription mentioning Serbian king Milutin was overpainted with the new inscription in 1484

The monastery and church, dedicated to Saint Nicetas, was built by the Serbian king Milutin ca. 1300 on the ruins of a previous church. The monastery was donated by Milutin short after their construction to the Serb monastery Chilandar on Mount Athos. St Nicetas was thoroughly renovated in 1484.

== Architecture ==
Saint Nicetas has a simple cross-in-square base with a central dome standing on pendentives and four columns. The outer decoration is typically Byzantine, done in layers of stone and red brick. The nicest decoration is to be found on the wall of the apse.

== Fresco paintings ==
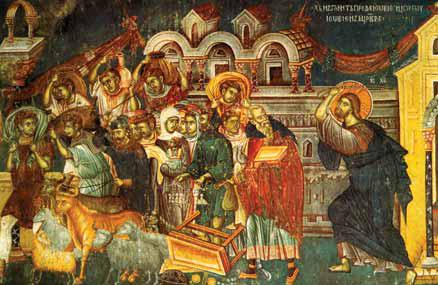
Jesus drives the Traders from the Temple, fresco by Michael and Eutichios, early 14th century

The signature on the shield of St Theodore reveals that the church was painted by the famous Michael, son of Eutichios, the favorite court painter of King Milutin who painted many other of his churches as well (for example Staro Nagoričane). The frescoes are well preserved and all date from around 1324, except those in the dome which are from 19th century, done by the well-known Dimitar "Dičo Zograf" Krstević.

One of the reasons for their good condition was the renovation of 1484 done in an astonishingly modern manner by the group that fresco painted Treskavec Monastery (1483), old katholikon of the Monastery of Great Meteoron (1483) and the church of St Nicholas of the Nun Eupraxia in Kastoria (1486).

In the lowest section are represented life size figures of saints. In the middle section we see Christ's miracles while in the upper parts of the church are representations of Passion. The inscriptions are in Greek and Church Slavonic of Serbian redaction.

== Iconostasis ==
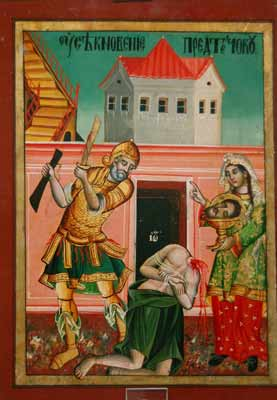
Saint John the Baptist by Dičo Zograf

The iconostasis of the church was painted in 1846/47 by Dičo Zograf.
