= Church of St. George, Banjane =

Church in Čučer-Sandevo Municipality, North Macedonia

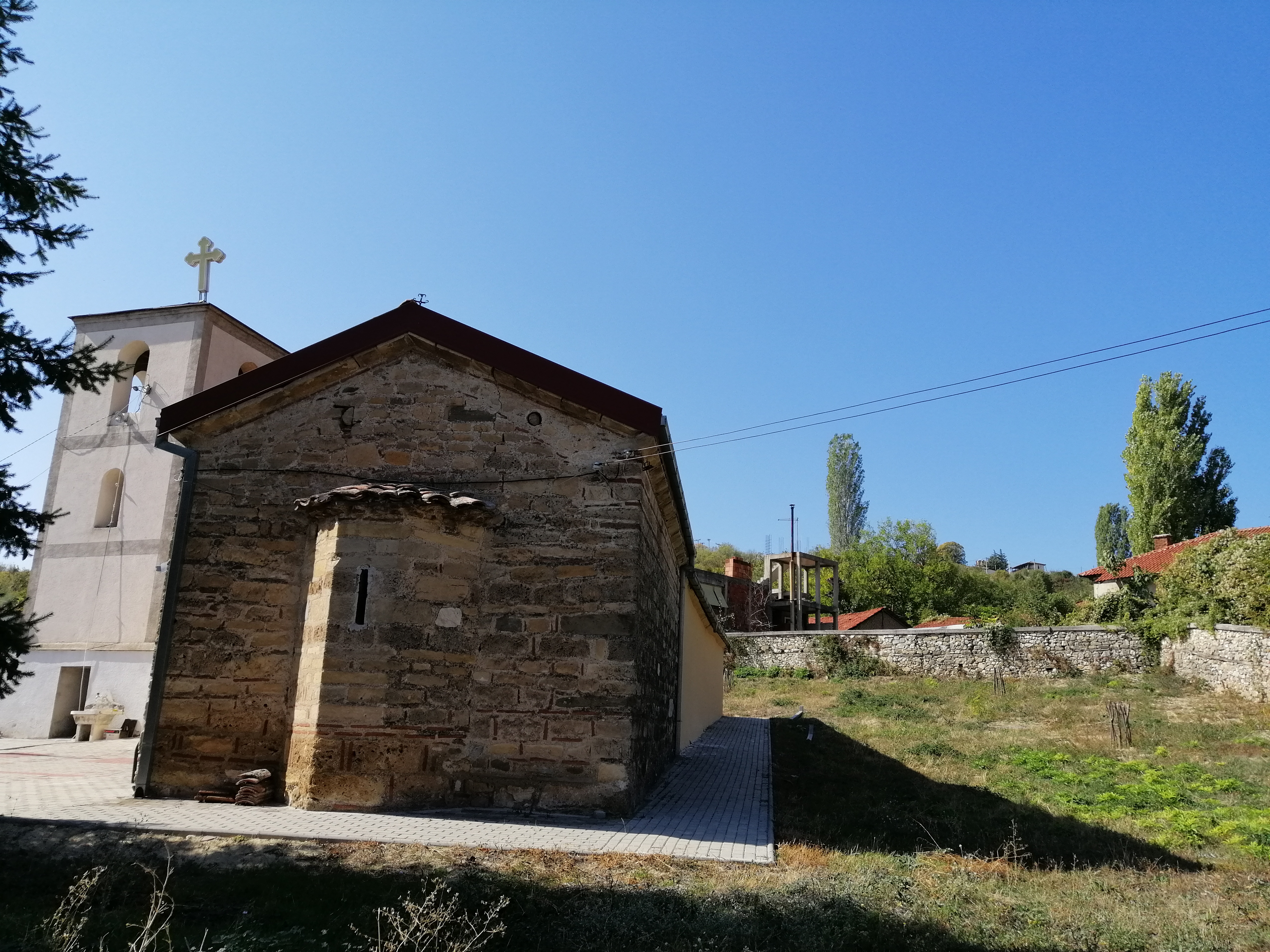
View of the church

Church of Saint George in Banjane (Macedonian Cyrillic: Свети Георгиј or Свети Ѓорѓи), north of Skopje, is an Orthodox Church dating from the Ottoman period. The church belongs to the Skopje diocese of the Macedonian Orthodox Church (Ohrid Archbishopric).

The simple church was built in 1548/49, as is recorded above its entrance. It is a single nave church with a vaulted ceiling and a quadrangle apse. The walls are constructed of stone surrounded with bricks and white mortar creating an impression similar to the older, 14th century churches, the golden age of church building in Macedonia.

The frescoes in the church have been done right after the construction. Their anonymous painter was a man of substantial technical skills, though not much talent. His compositions are well envisioned and dynamic, all in vivid colors. Among the most interesting frescoes are Christ as high priest surrounded with seraphim, then Mother of God with a crown and the Christmas Hymn of Saint John Damascene. In the lowest zone, among the most important saints we find also Saint Sava and Saint Simeon, a common feature in all Serb churches at the time.

The iconostasis was painted in 1846 by Dicho Zograf.

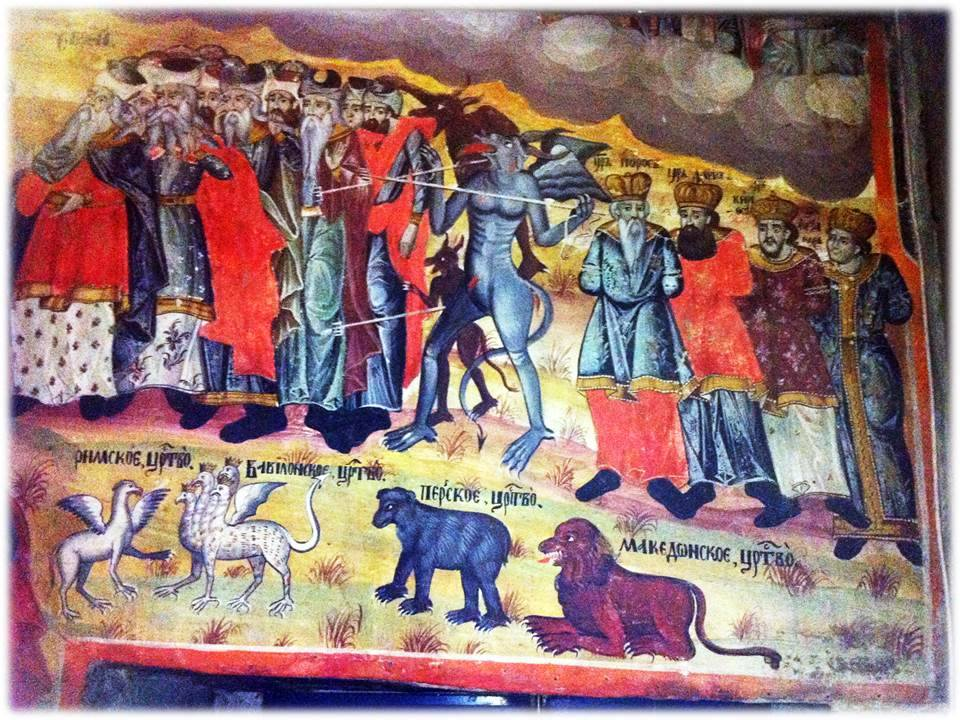
Fresco of the Judgement Day

After the building of the wide narthex in 1856, it was painted as well by Dicho Zograf. Here we find the interesting fresco of the Judgment Day with the representations of the four empires of the world as animals and with four emperors – Porus, Darius, Cyrus and Alexander the Great – all led by devils to damnation.

On the west facade of the church are painted frescoes by Dimitrije Andonov Papradiški, of which composition of the Judgement Day occupies half of the depicted space.
