= St Nikola Macedonian Orthodox Church, Preston =

St Nikola Macedonian Orthodox Church
- Македонска Православна Црква "Свети Никола"; Makedonska Pravoslavna Crkva "Sveti Nikola"
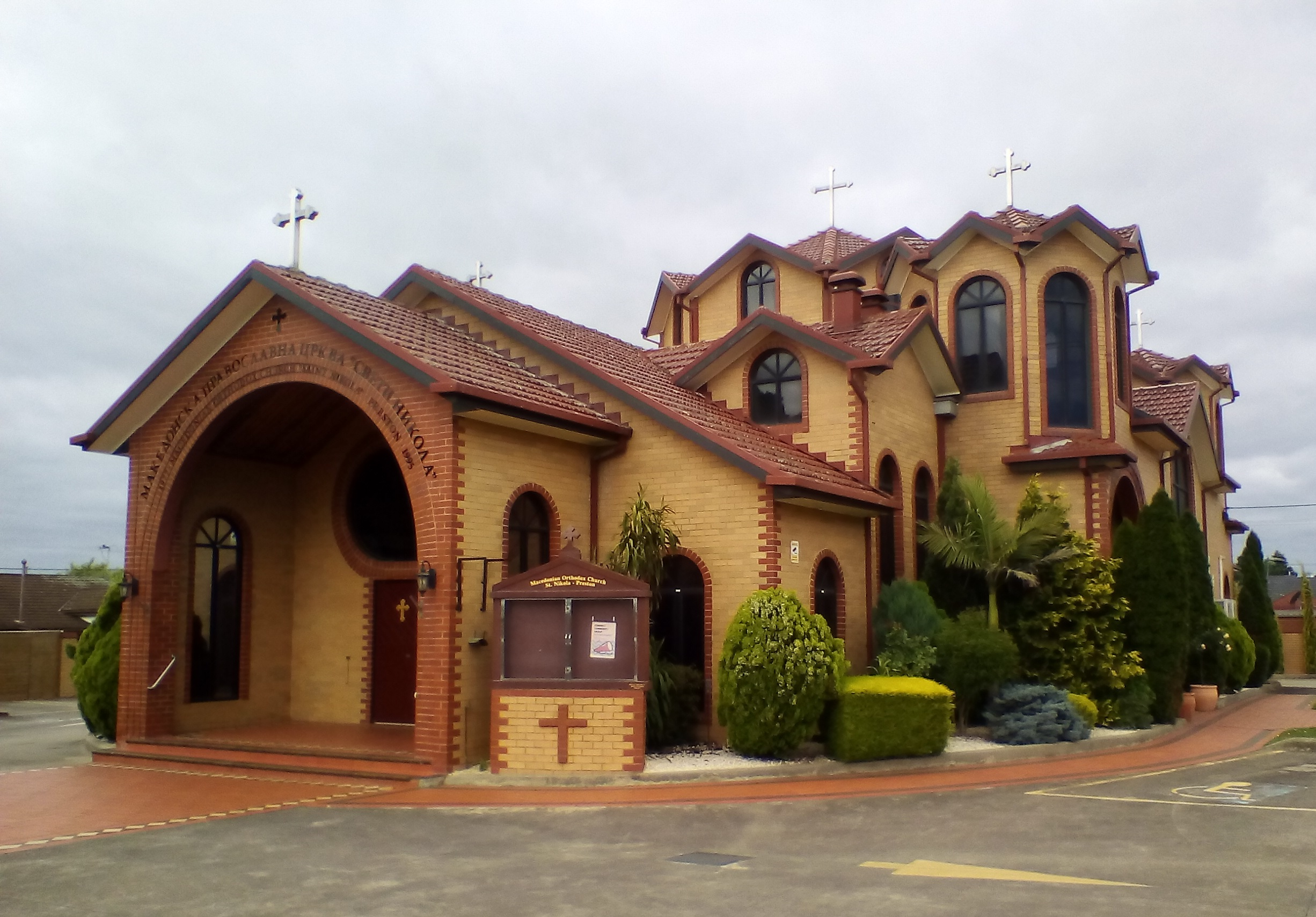

- Location in greater metropolitan Melbourne
- 37°43′55″S 145°01′27″E
- Location: 130 Tyler Street, Preston 3072, Melbourne, Victoria
- Country: Australia
- Denomination: Macedonian Orthodox
- Website: St Nikola Church

History
- Status: Church
- Founded: c. 1978
- Dedication: Saint Nicholas

Architecture
- Functional status: Active
- Architectural type: Church

Administration
- Diocese: Macedonian Orthodox Diocese of Australia and New Zealand

Clergy
- Priest: Reverend Father Trajko Mojsov

The St Nikola Macedonian Orthodox Church (Macedonian: Македонска Православна Црква "Свети Никола", Makedonska Pravoslavna Crkva "Sveti Nikola") is the Macedonian Orthodox church located in Preston, a suburb of northern Melbourne, Victoria, Australia. First consecrated on 5 February 1978, after a fire, the church was rebuilt and reconsecrated in 1996. Attendance by parishioners averages at some 200 per liturgy.

== History ==
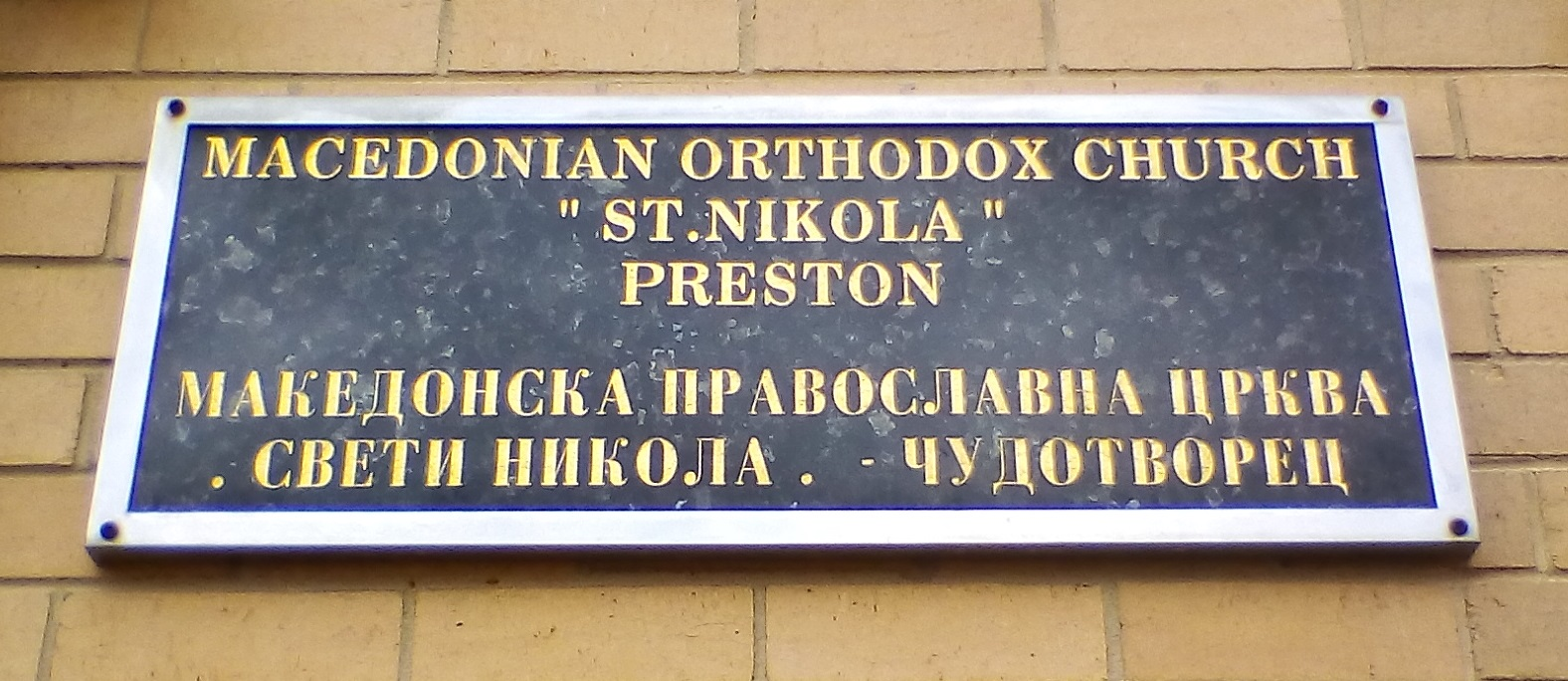
Church plaque

The Community of St.Nikola, a church organisation was founded (1974) in Preston by the Macedonian community. The St Nikola community had arisen from the Cyril and Metodius Cultural Association. The initiative committee of the organisation was composed of Gorgi Pisevski, its president, along with Mile Panov, Gorgi Petro and Nikola Vasilevski. The consecration of St Nikola church took place during 1978 by Archbishop Dositej and the Metropolitan Kiril. The new church was the renovated former Salvation Army Citadel converted to a traditional style church. (Whittlesea Post, 1 March 1978 )

St Nikola was a wooden building, and a fire (February 1995) left it in ruins. The Arson Squad of Victoria Police considered the fire suspicious, and the Macedonian community felt despondent by the event. Tensions existed at the time between the local Macedonian and Greek communities, and within that context, the fire was viewed to have been a deliberate act. Some people in the St Nikola Church Committee attributed responsibility for the fire to the Greek lobby.

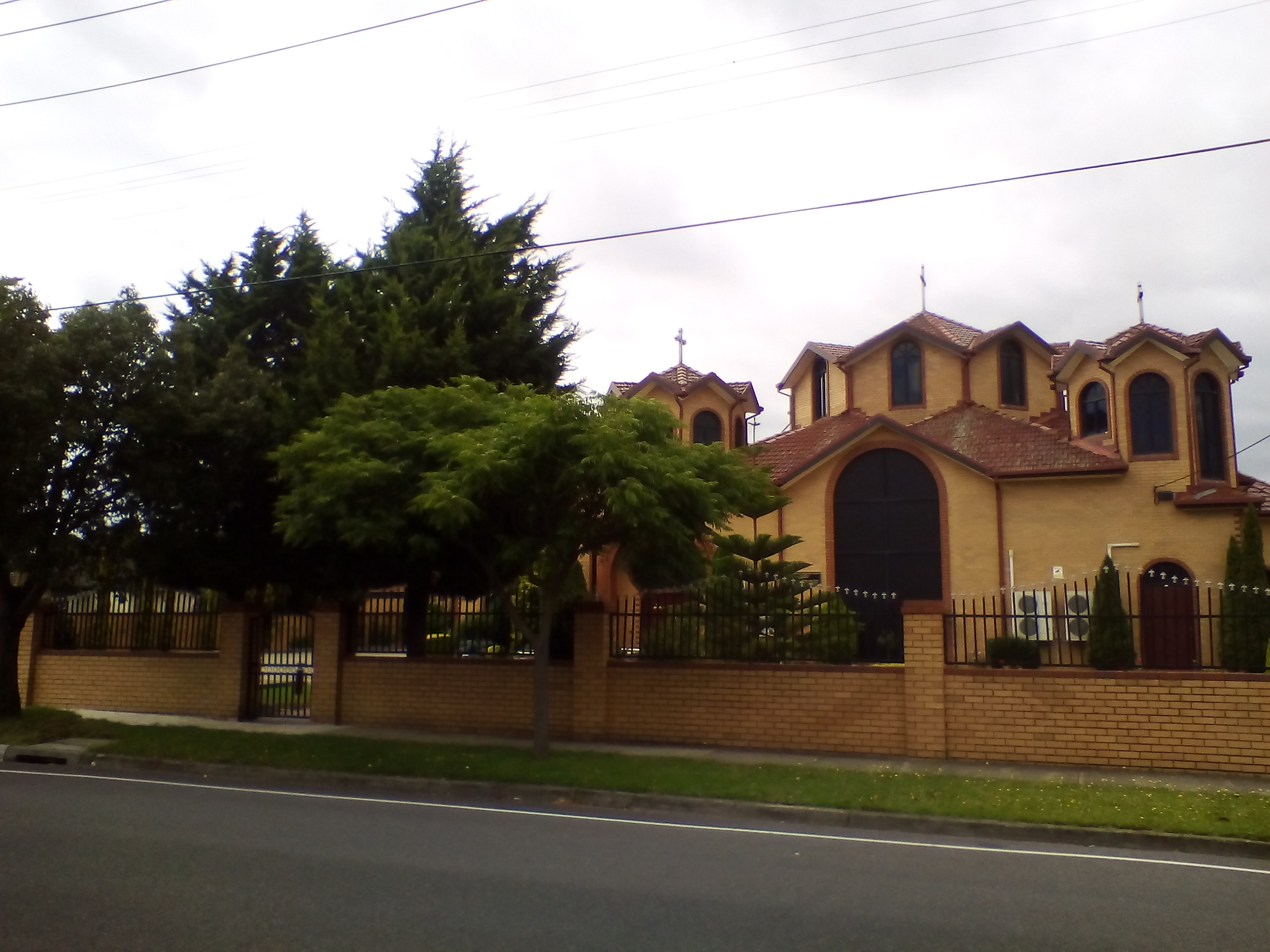
View from Tyler st

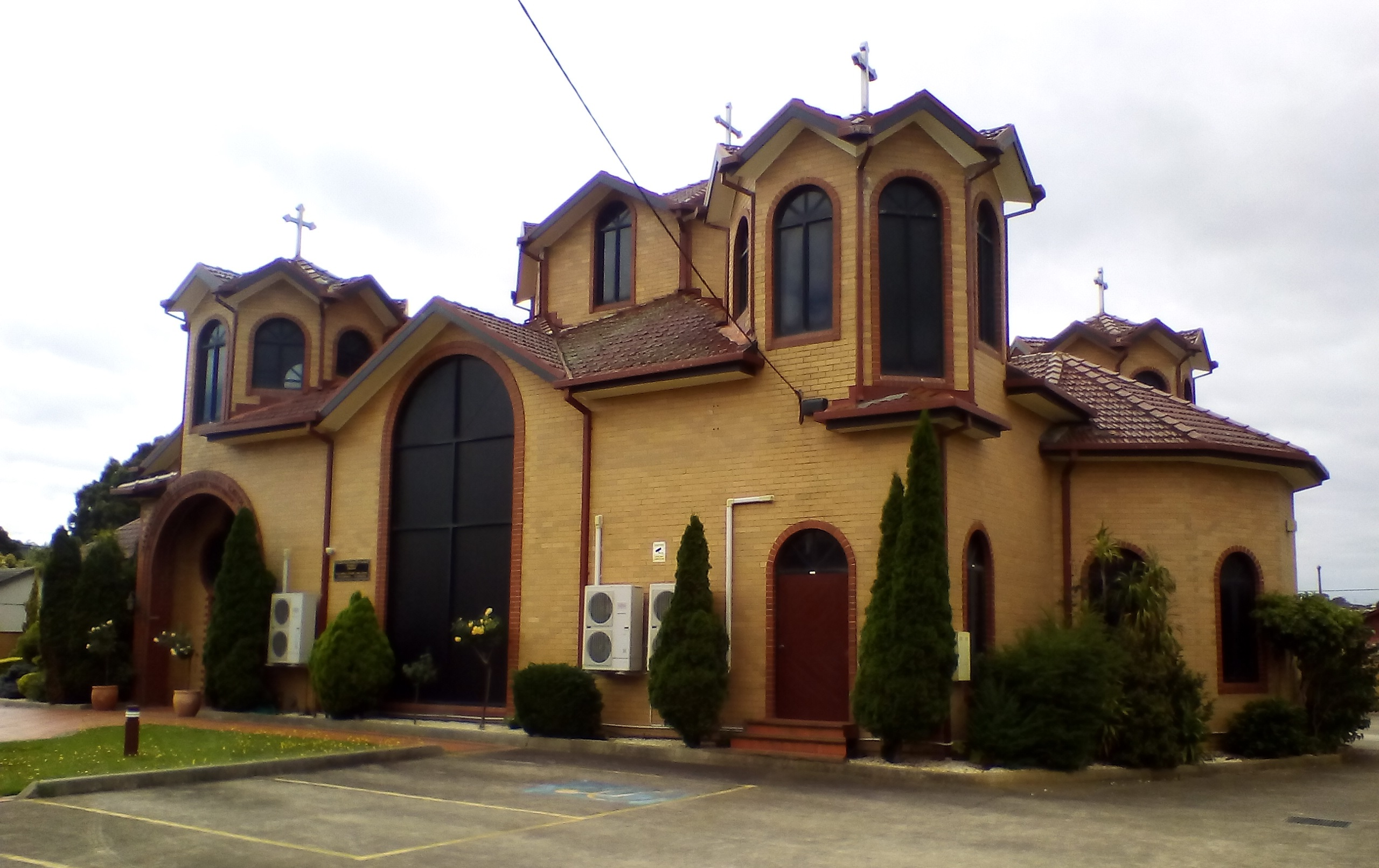
View of church (right side)

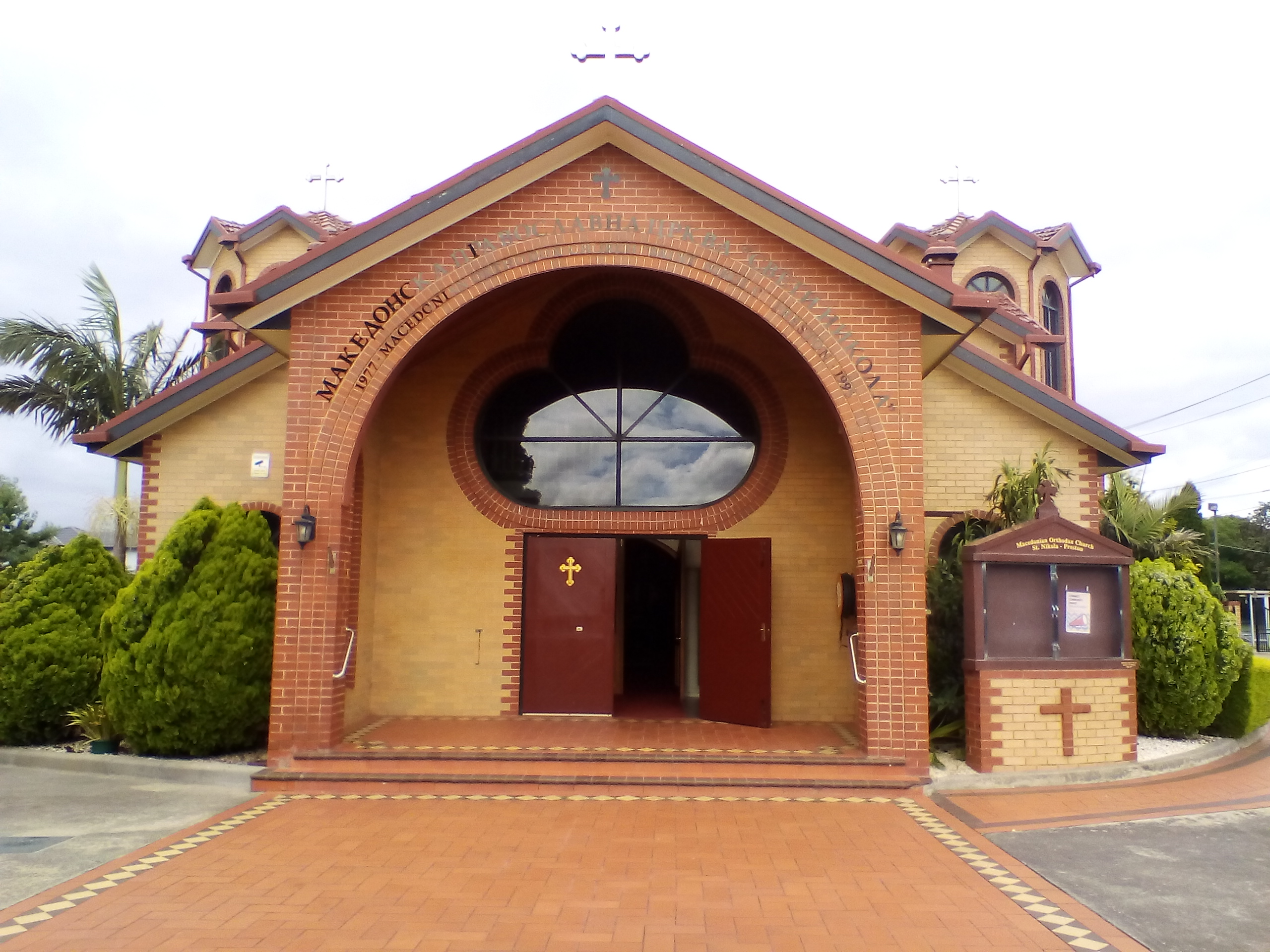
Church main entrance

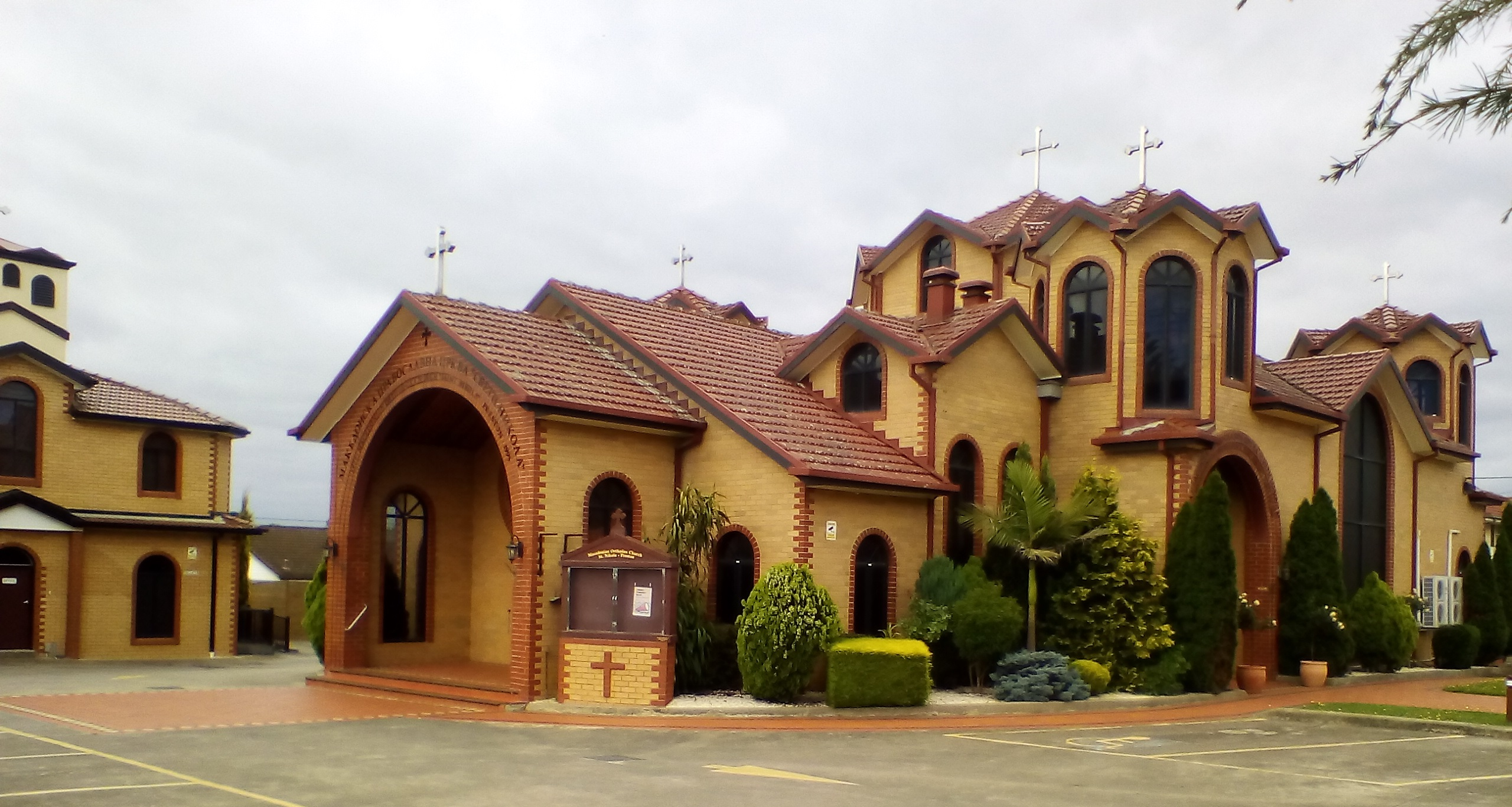
View of church (right side)

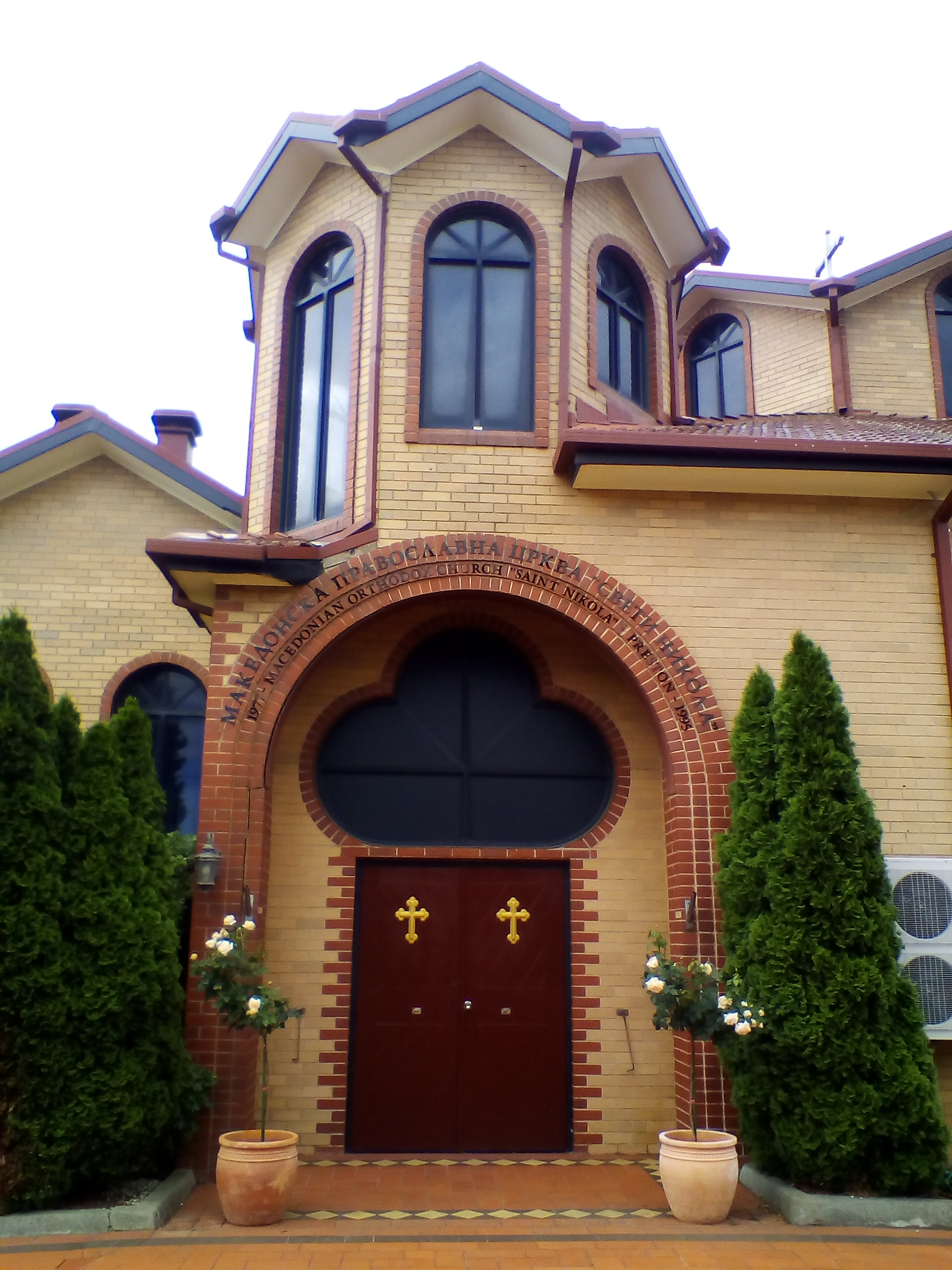
Entrance (right side)

President Pisevski led the efforts of the local Preston Macedonian Community to reconstruct the church as a brick building. Funds were collected from the Macedonian community, who assisted by providing labour as well. Following nearly 6 months of reconstruction, the new church of St Nikola was consecrated (May 1996) by Bishops Peter and Stefan, along with Protogeacon Ratomir Grozdanovski, the Macedonian Holy Synod secretary. The consecration ceremony was attended by over 10,000 people and their donations amounted to some $100,000.

In early 2016, the nearby church residence building caught fire due to the electrical switchboard being exposed to a water leak, and Father Nikodim Solunchev was rescued when he leaped 3.5 metres into the arms of police.

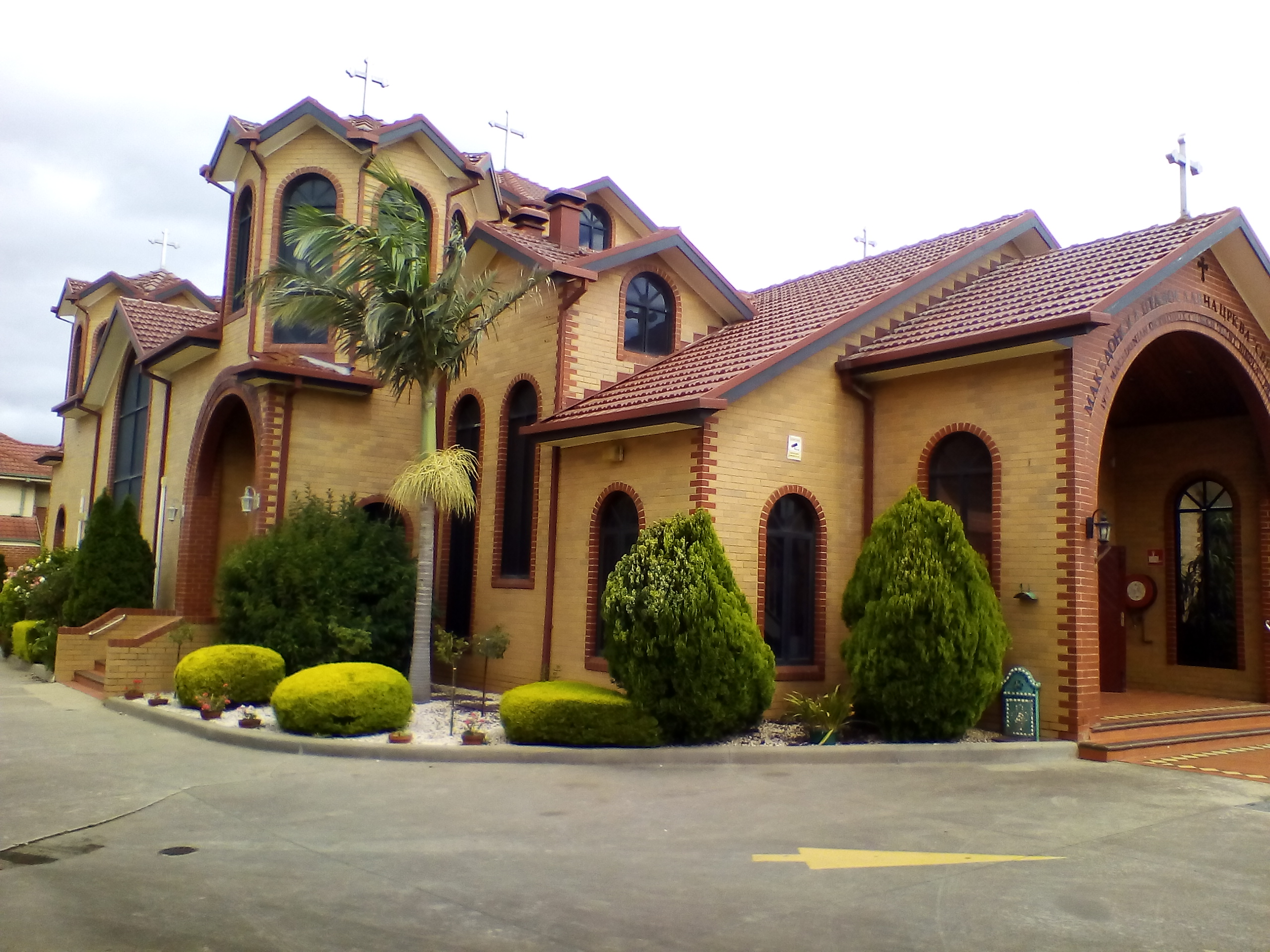
View of church (left side)

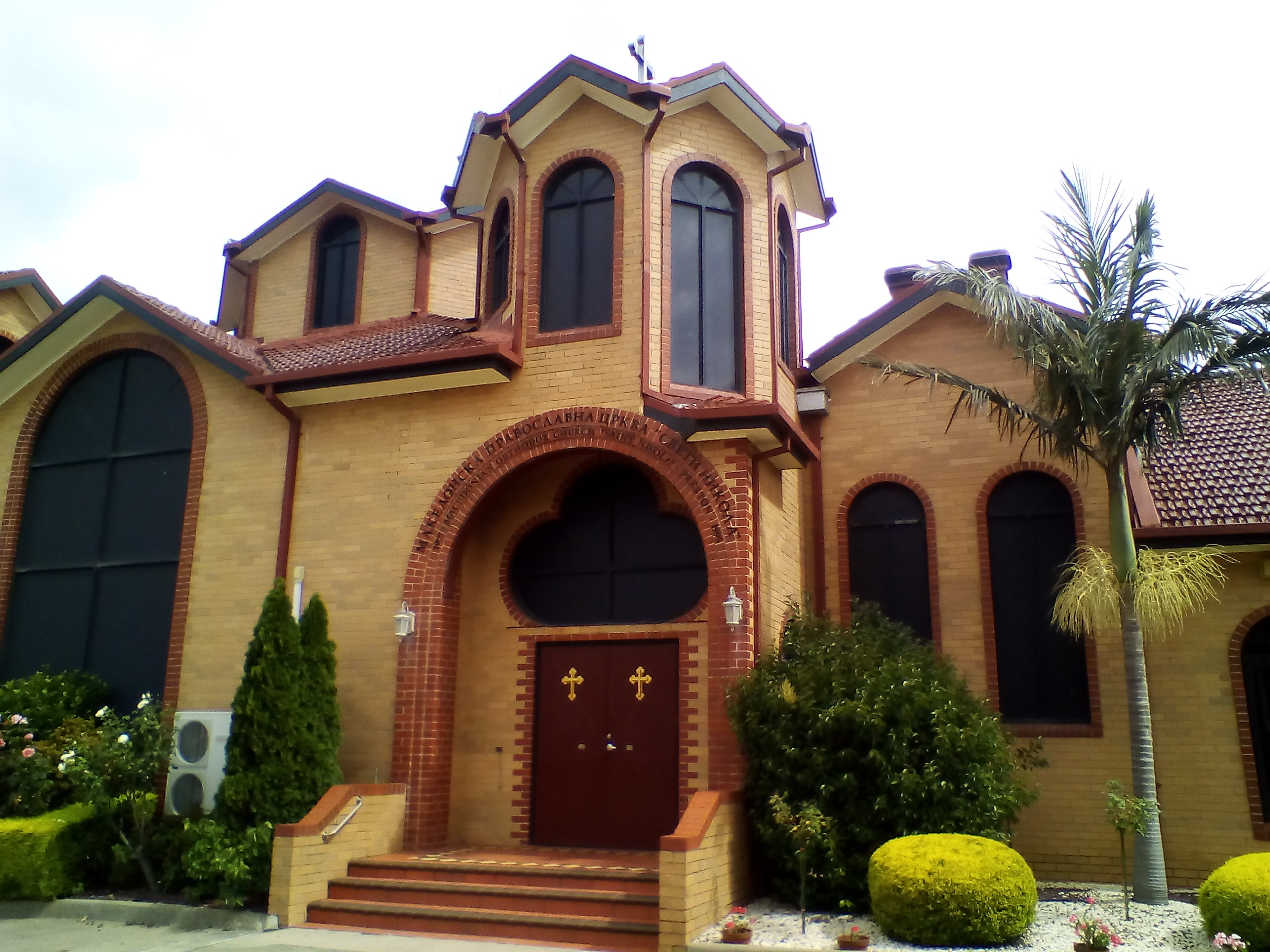
Entrance (left side)

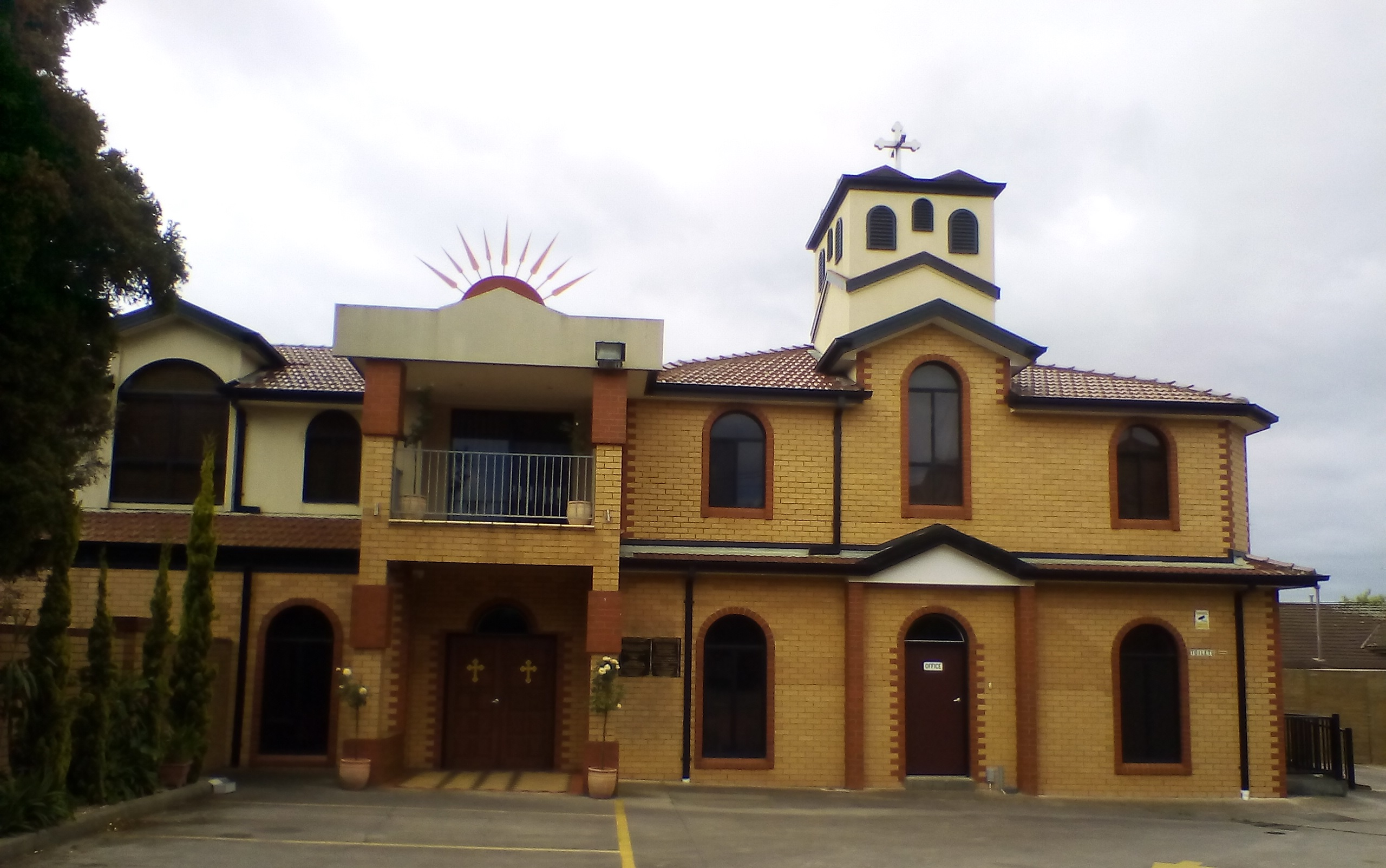
Church residence building

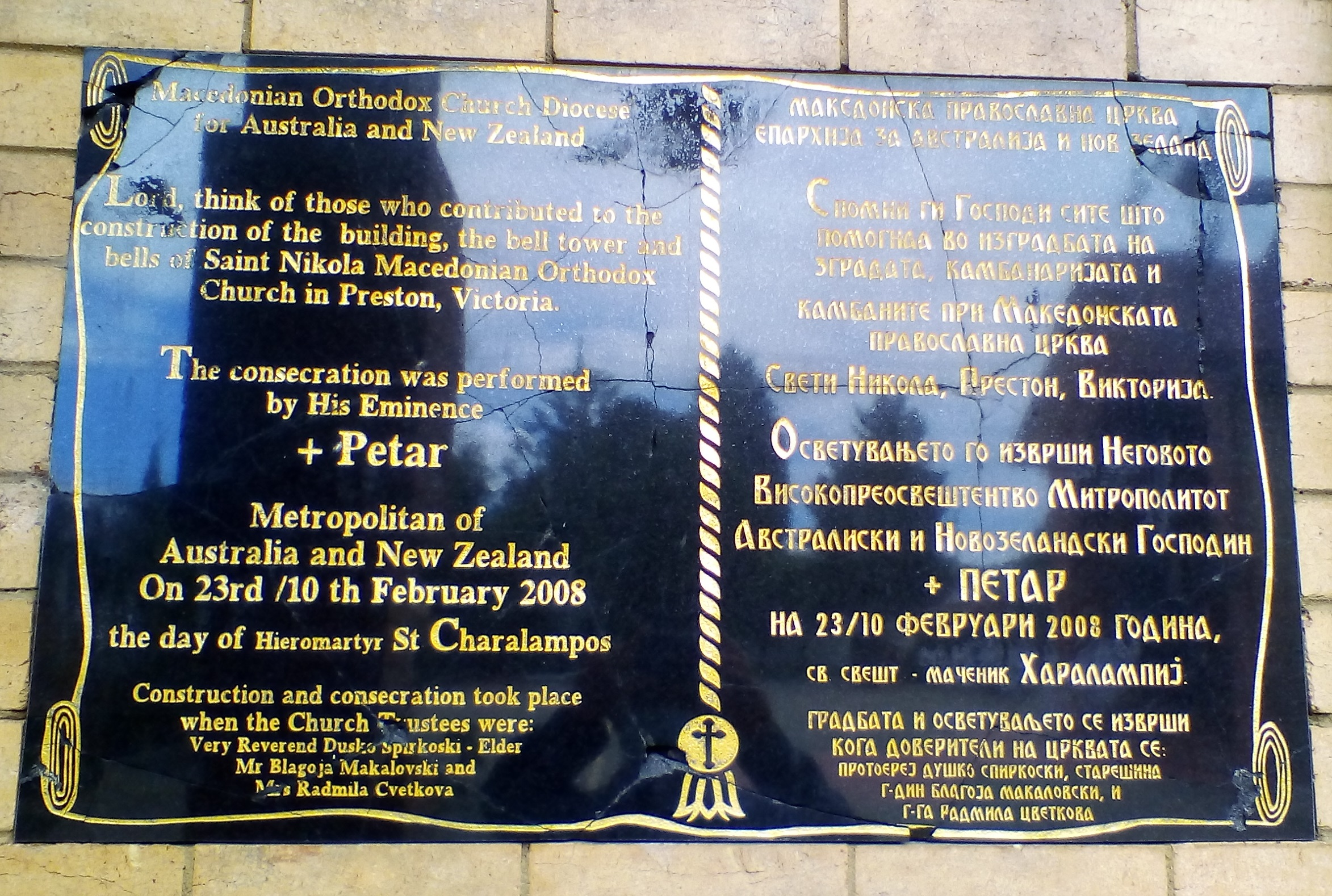
Plaque (residence building)

In early 2018, amid efforts by the Republic of Macedonia and Greece to resolve the Macedonia naming dispute, the St Nikola church was vandalised with racist and violent graffiti. The incident was reported by the Macedonian community to Victoria police, and the local council removed the graffiti.

The Macedonian community celebrated the fortieth anniversary of the church's founding in late 2018.

== See also ==
- Macedonian Australians
