= Gluvo =

Gluvo Глуво
- Village
- Location within North Macedonia
- Coordinates: 42.085680°N 21.398297°E
- Country: North Macedonia
- Region: Skopje
- Municipality: Čučer-Sandevo

Population (2002)
  - Total: 349
- Time zone: UTC+1 (CET)
  - Summer (DST): UTC+2 (CEST)
- Website: .

Gluvo (Macedonian: Глуво) is a village in the municipality of Čučer-Sandevo, North Macedonia.

== Demographics ==
According to the 2002 census, the village had a total of 349 inhabitants. Ethnic groups in the village include:

- Macedonians 318
- Serbs 31
