= Church of Saint Sophia, Ohrid =

Church in Ohrid, North Macedonia

Coordinates: 41°06′43.52″N 20°47′38.81″E

Church of Saint Sophia
- Света Софија; Sveta Sofija
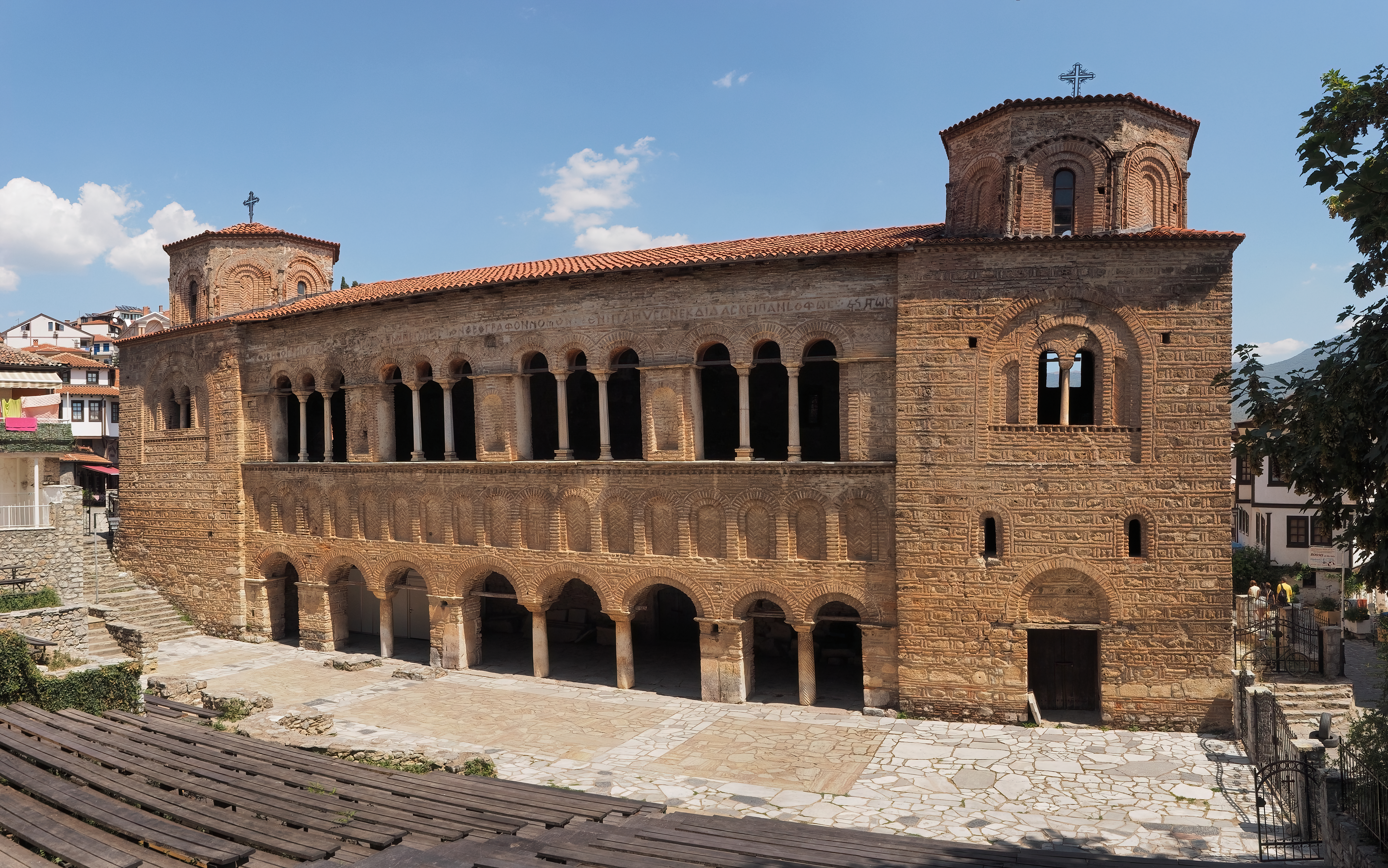
- The exterior of the church (rear courtyard)

Religion
- Affiliation: Macedonian Orthodox Church

Location
- Location: Ohrid
- Country: North Macedonia
- Interactive map of Church of Saint Sophia

Architecture
- Type: Middle-Byzantine
- Style: Byzantine style
- Completed: 9th century AD

UNESCO World Heritage Site
- Official name: Natural and Cultural Heritage of the Ohrid region
- Type: Natural, Cultural
- Criteria: i, iii, iv, vii
- Designated: 1979 (3rd session)
- Reference no.: 99
- Region: Europe and North America
- Extensions: 1980, 2019

The Church of Saint Sophia (Macedonian: Црква Света Софија, romanized: Crkva Sveta Sofija) is a church in Ohrid, North Macedonia. The church is one of the most important monuments of North Macedonia, housing architecture and art from the Middle Ages.

== History ==
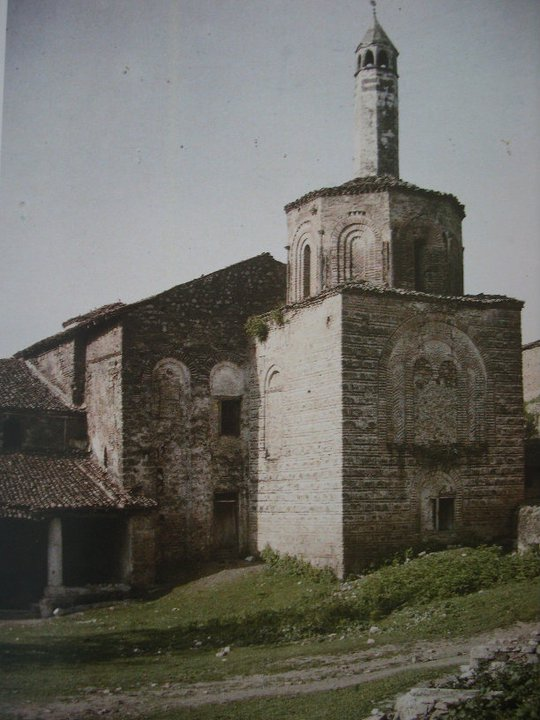
"St. Sophia as a Mosque", Ohrid, "Autochrome", Auguste Léon, 1913

The current church was built on the foundations of a metropolitan cathedral demolished in the first decade of the 6th century by the barbarian invasions that brought the early Slavs into the region. The next church was built during the First Bulgarian Empire, after the official conversion to Christianity. Some sources date the building of the church during the rule of Knyaz Boris I (852–889). It was basically rebuilt in the last decade of the 10th century as a patriarchal cathedral in the form of a dome basilica, after the replacement of the capital of Bulgaria in Ohrid, during the reign of Tsar Samuil, when the church was the seat of the Bulgarian Patriarchate, an autocephalous Patriarchate. Later it became a seat of the Archbishopric of Ohrid, under the Patriarchate of Constantinople until the 18th century.

It was converted into a mosque during the rule of the Ottoman Empire. The interior of the church has been preserved with frescoes from the 11th, 12th and 13th century, which represent some of the most significant achievements in Byzantine painting of the time. The main part of the church was built in the 11th century, while external additions were built by Archbishop Gregory II in the 14th century.

In November 2009, the Macedonian Orthodox Church adopted a new coat of arms with the church of St. Sophia as a charge on the shield.

A detail from the church is depicted on the reverse of the 1000 Macedonian denar banknote, issued in 1996 and 2003.

== Gallery ==
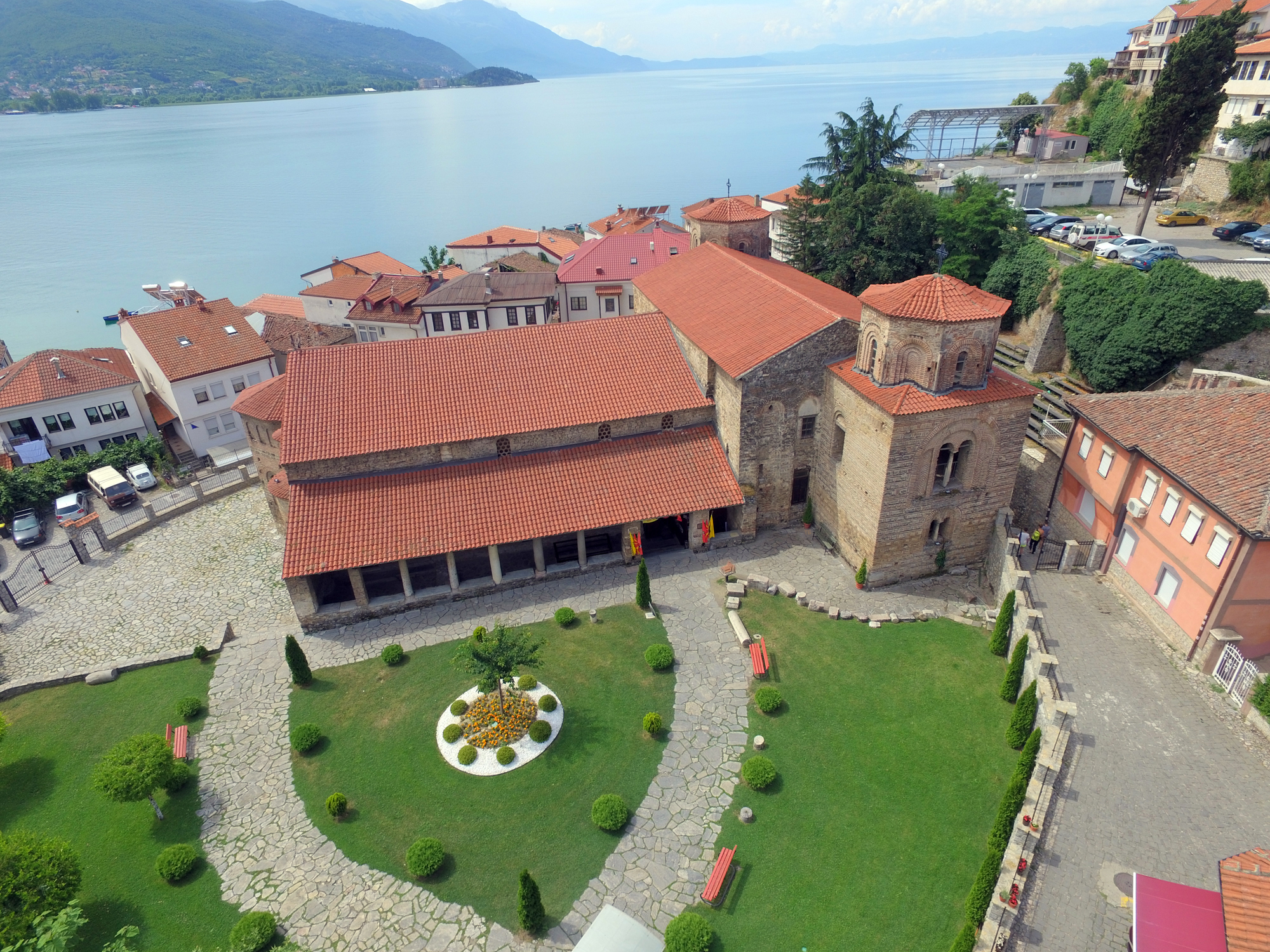
Aerial view of the church

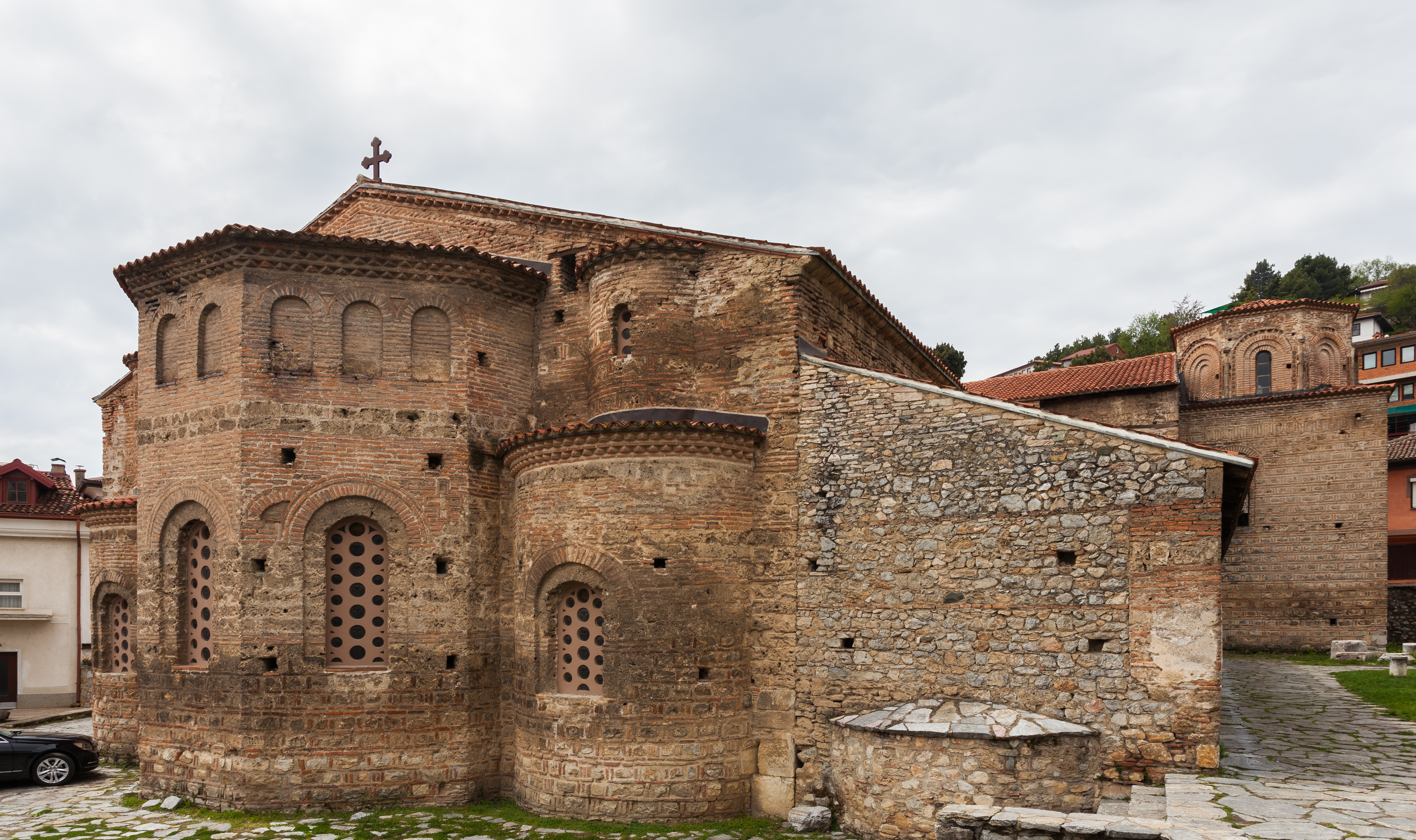
West side of the church

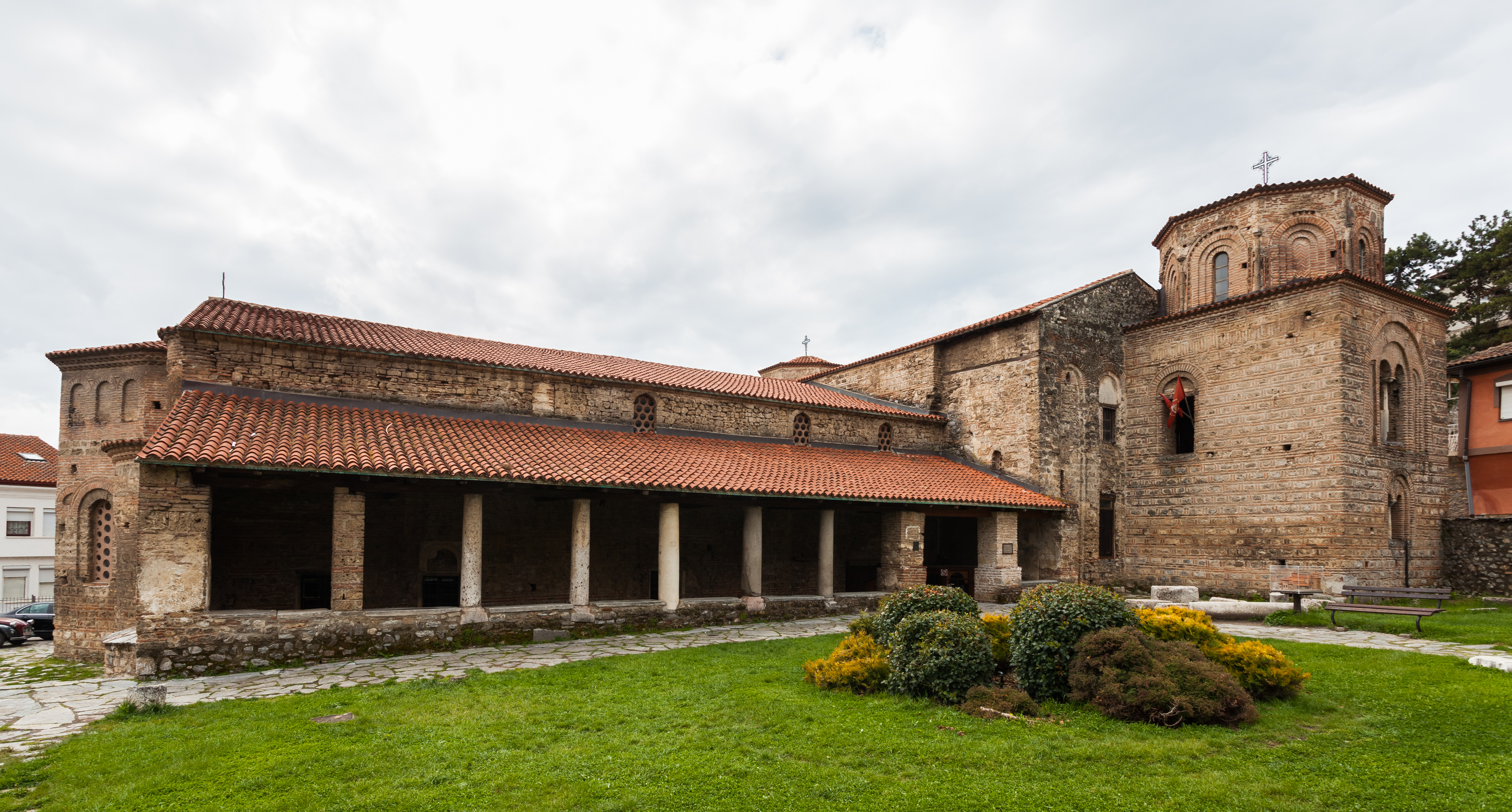
Narthex of St Sophia

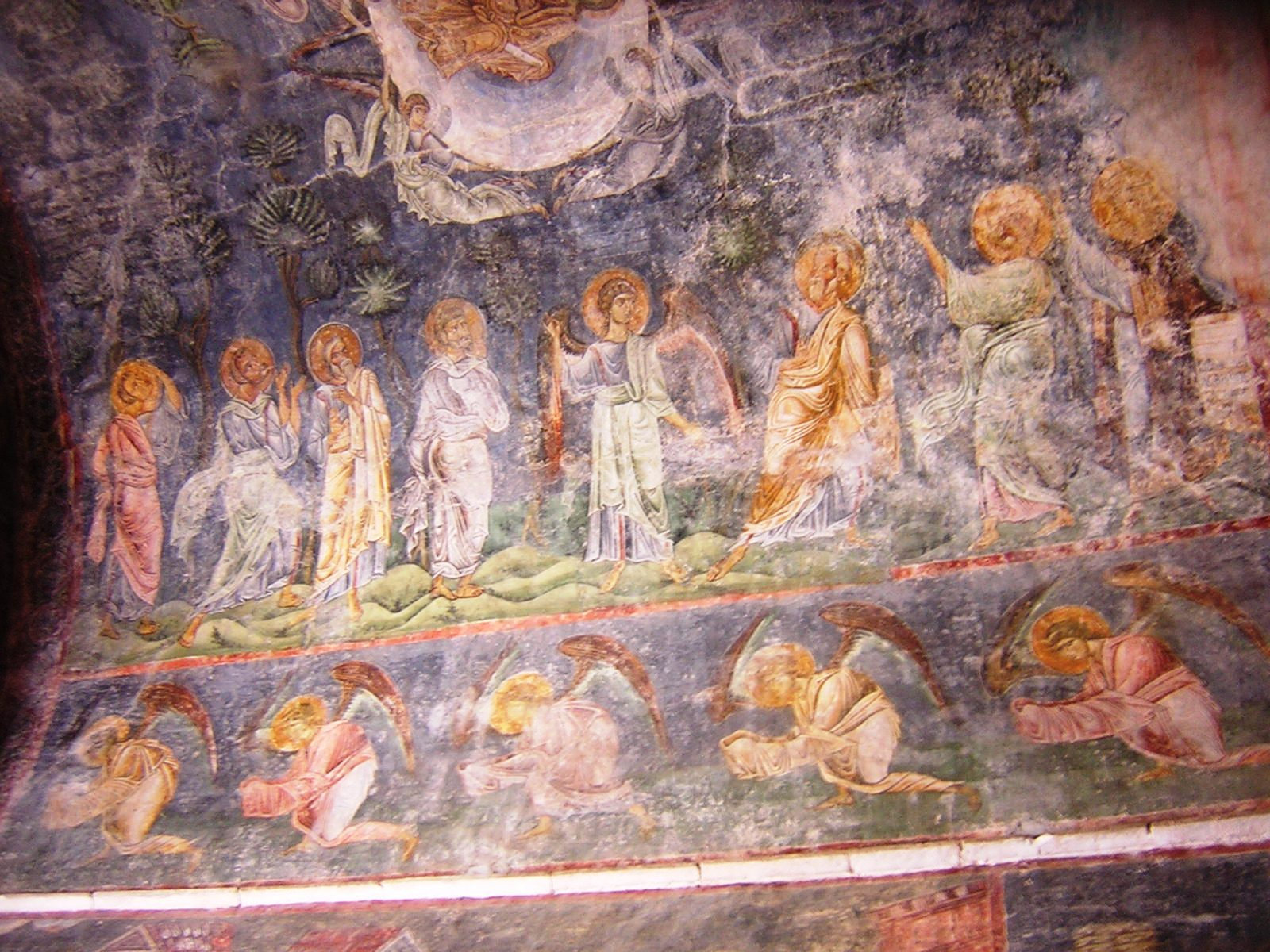
Ceiling frescoes in the Church of St. Sophia

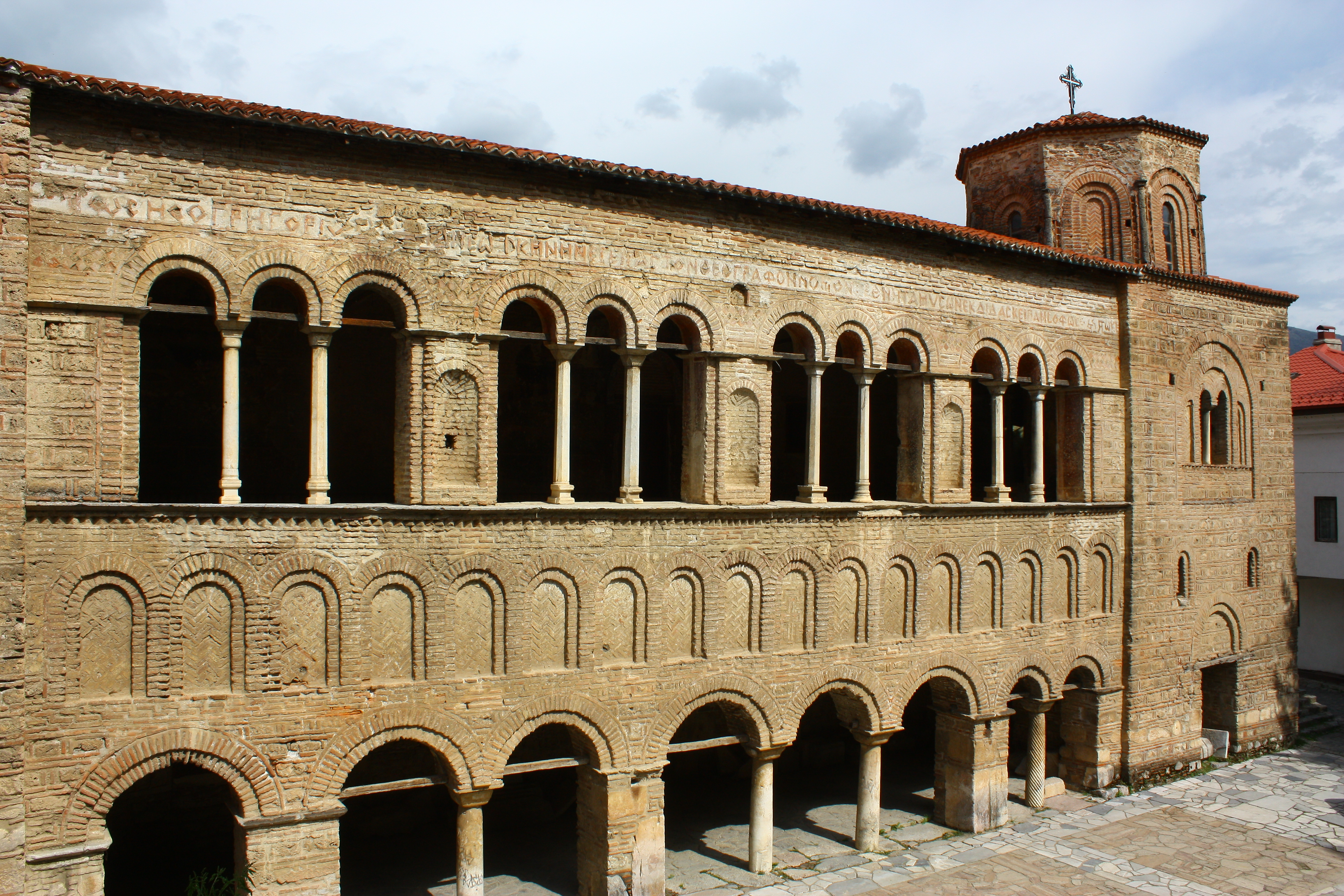
Byzantine Greek inscription on the exterior, seen from the rear courtyard

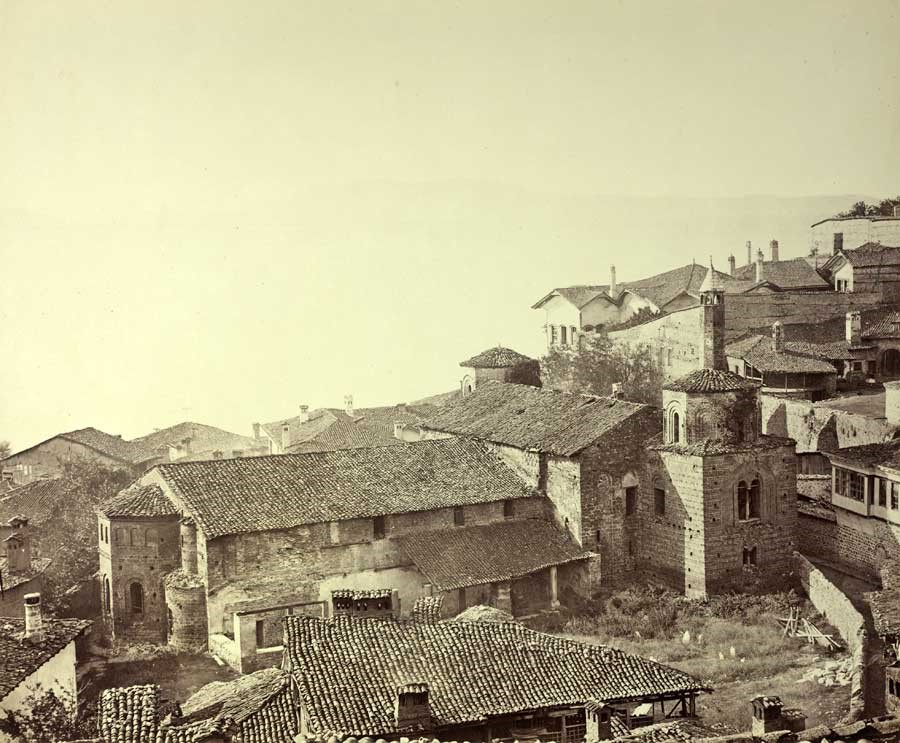
St Sophia and its surroundings in 1863

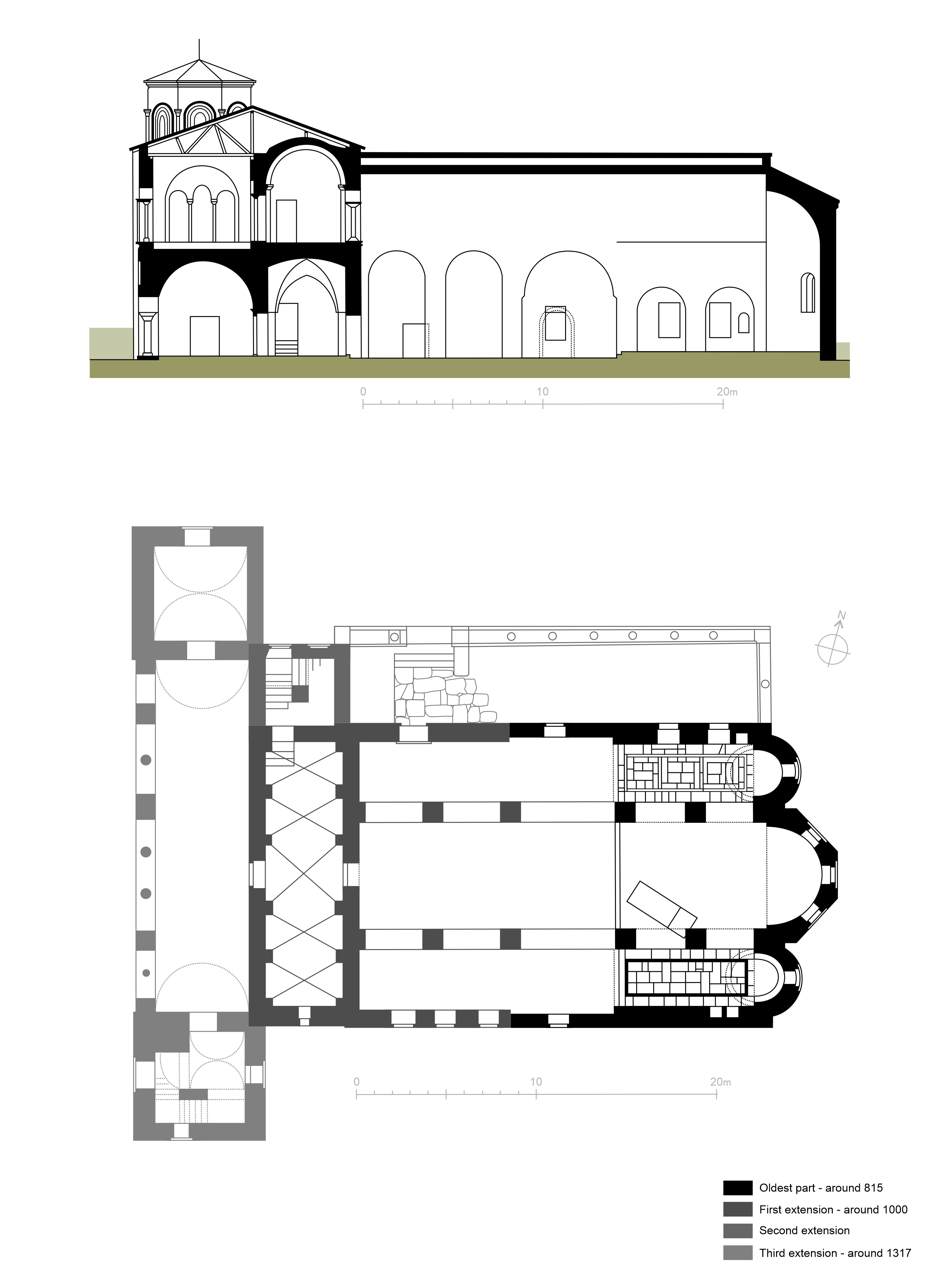
Plan of the Church

== See also ==
=== Churches in Ohrid ===
- Church of St. John at Kaneo
- Church of Sts. Clement and Panteleimon
