= Hilarion (Serafimovski) =

- Metropolitan of Diocese of Bregalnica
- Native name: Ivica Serafimovski
- See: Skopje
- Elected: June 29, 2006
- In office: July 13, 2006
- Predecessor: Agatangel

Personal details
- Born: January 13, 1973 (age 53) Kumanovo, Macedonia; SFR Yugoslavia (today: North Macedonia)
- Denomination: Eastern Orthodox Christianity
- Residence: Lesnovo monastery
- Education: Skopje University

Hilarion (secuale name Ivica Serafimovski, Macedonian: Ивица Серафимовски; born 1973) is the metropolitan of the diocese of Bregalnica of the Macedonian Orthodox Church.
