= Coat of arms of the Macedonian Orthodox Church – Archdiocese of Ohrid =

- 2009 version
- Armiger: Macedonian Orthodox Church – Archdiocese of Ohrid
- Shield: Gules, an Eastern Orthodox temple (Church of Saint Sophia, Ohrid) Or. The shield is under a mantle Gules lined Argent. The mantle is ensigned with a Bishop's mitre Or. Behind the mantle, a cross and a sceptre in saltire both Or
- Use: Macedonian Orthodox Church – Ohrid Archbishopric

The coat of arms of the Macedonian Orthodox Church – Archdiocese of Ohrid are the official arms of the Macedonian Orthodox Church

A new version of the coat of arms was adopted on 12 November 2009, replacing the old coat of arms of the church. The new coat of arms was adopted on the meeting in Skopje where the name "Archdiocese of Ohrid" was added to the organisation's name. The new coat of arms replaces the image of the Church of St. Mary Peribleptos with the Church of St. Sophia in Ohrid.
