= Čučer-Sandevo =

Čučer-Sandevo Чучер-Сандево
- Village
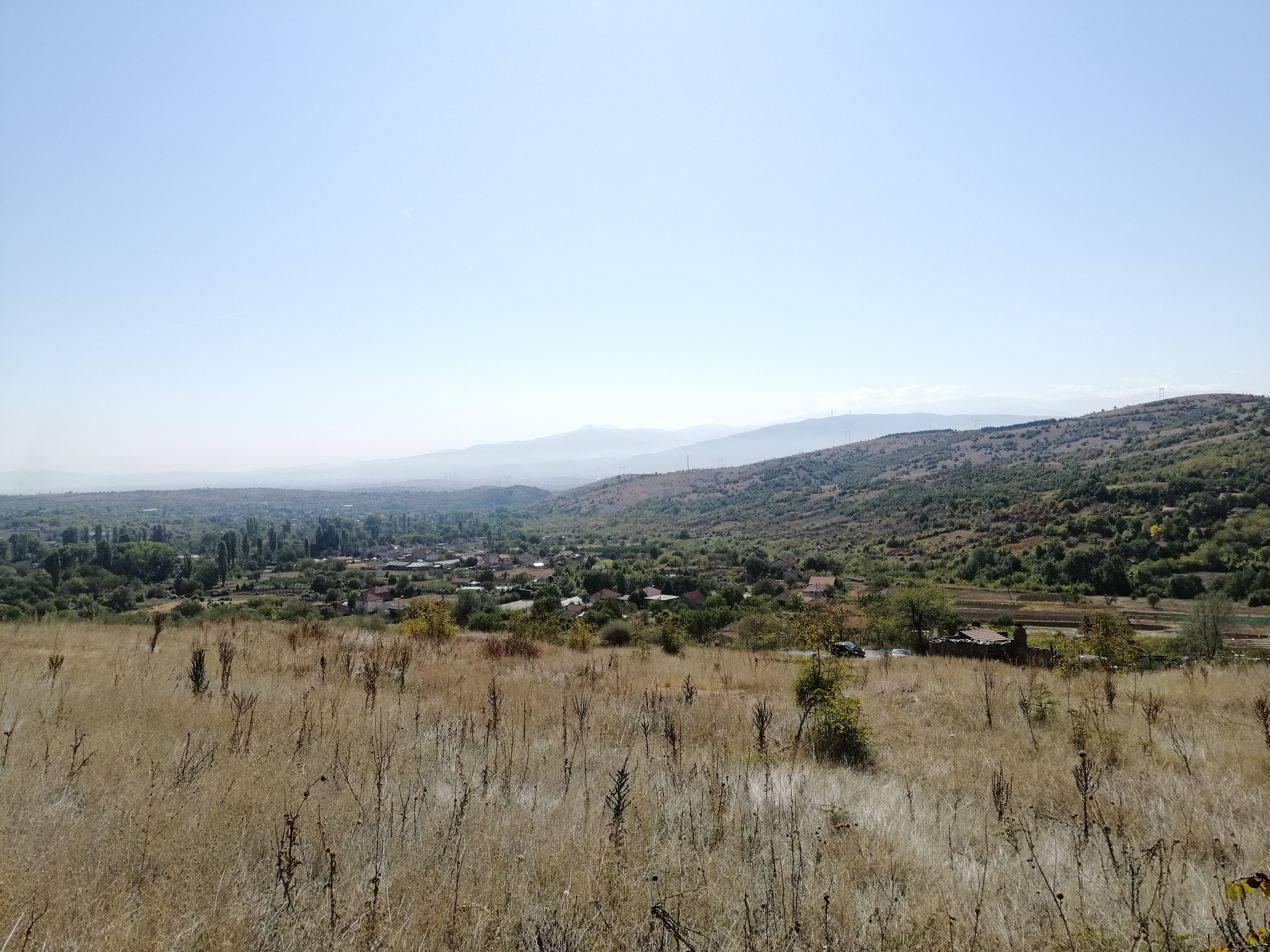

- Flag Coat of arms

- Location within North Macedonia
- Coordinates: 42°6′12″N 21°22′55″E
- Country: North Macedonia
- Region: Skopje
- Municipality: Čučer-Sandevo

Government
  - Mayor: Jovan Pejkovski
- Elevation: 447 m (1,467 ft)

Population
  - Total: 290
- Time zone: UTC+1 (CET)
  - Summer (DST): UTC+2 (CEST)
- Area code: +389 02
- Vehicle registration: SK

Čučer-Sandevo (Macedonian: Чучер-Сандево) is a village in Republic of North Macedonia. It is a seat of the Čučer-Sandevo Municipality.

== Geography ==
The village is located in the northern part of the Skopje Valley, in the central part of the territory of the Municipality of Čučer-Sandevo. The village is hilly, at an altitude of 540 meters. The area covers 11 km^{2}. In the area, the pastures cover 596 hectares, 238 hectares fall to the arable land, while the forests have 114 hectares.

The village is located on southwestern parts of Skopska Crna Gora. Čučer-Sandevo is 15 km away from Skopje.

== History ==
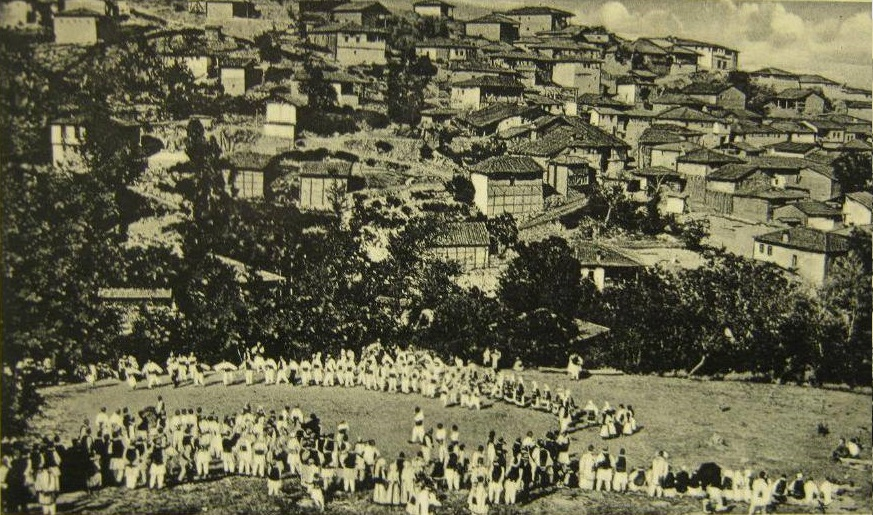
Old photography of Čučer.

According to Bulgarian ethnographer Vasil Kanchov, in 1900 the village had 360 inhabitants who were Bulgarian Christians. While according to the Secretary of the Bulgarian Exarchate Dimitar Mišev ("La Macédoine et sa Population Chrétienne"), in 1905 there were 640 Bulgarians in the village, labelled by him as patriarchs (Serbomans). According to Bulgarian sources, the village was settled by Serbs in the period between 1689 and 1739. In his 1927 map of Macedonia, German explorer Leonhard Schultze-Jena shows Čučer as a Serbian village. In 1929, in his map of Northwest Macedonia, Russian scientist Afanasii Selishchev shows Čučer as a Bulgarian village instead. The original name of the village was Čučer; Sandevo ("Sande's") was added after World War II in honour of Aleksandar Urdarevski-Sande.

== Demographics ==
The village had 518 inhabitants in 1961, of which 328 were Serbs and 180 Macedonians. In 1994 the number decreased to 274 inhabitants, of which 234 were Serbs and 35 Macedonians.

According to the 2002 census, Čučer-Sandevo had a population of 299 inhabitants, of whom 180 were Serbs (60%), 117 Macedonians (39%), and 1 other.

As of the 2021 census, Čučer-Sandevo had 290 residents with the following ethnic composition:

- Serbs 134
- Macedonians 107
- Persons for whom data are taken from administrative sources 41
- Others 8

== Anthropology ==
According to Skopska Crna Gora (1971), the following families (or "brotherhoods") lived in Čučer.

- Čučer
  - Kačaniklići (Качаниклићи). Four families. The ancestor of the Kačaniklić brotherhood in Čučer fled from Đurđev Dol in the nearby Kačanik Gorge (hence their surname), due to violence in ca. 1810 (during Ottoman rule). They have the slava (patron saint) of St. John. They derived their family name from their previous location.
  - Livrinići
  - Kajevići

== Notable people ==
- Aleksandar Urdarevski, partisan who participated in the resistance and National Hero of Yugoslavia

== Sources ==
- Trifunoski, Jovan F. (1971). Skopska Crna Gora: Prirodna sredina, proslost, naselja, stanovnistvo i prvreda. Univerzitet "Kiril i Metodij".
