= Macedonian Orthodox Church =

Eastern Orthodox church in North Macedonia

Macedonian Orthodox Church – Archdiocese of Ohrid
- Македонска православна црква – Охридска архиепископија
- Coat of arms of the MOC, with the Church of St. Sophia, Ohrid, the historical seat of the Archbishopric of Ohrid, depicted on it
- Abbreviation: AO, MOC, MOC-AO
- Type: Autocephaly
- Classification: Christian
- Orientation: Eastern Orthodox
- Scripture: Septuagint; New Testament
- Theology: Eastern Orthodox theology
- Primate: Stefan, Archbishop of Ohrid and Macedonia
- Region: North Macedonia
- Language: Church Slavonic; Macedonian
- Liturgy: Byzantine Rite
- Territory: North Macedonia
- Possessions: United States; Canada; Australia; European Union
- Independence: Self-proclaimed autocephaly in 1967; 59 years ago from the Serbian Orthodox Church (SOC); Returned to autonomous status under the SOC on 16 May 2022; 4 years ago; Autocephaly granted on 5 June 2022; 4 years ago by the SOC
- Recognition: Recognised as an autonomous church under the SOC 1959–1967, and mid-May–early June 2022; Autocephaly recognised by several Eastern Orthodox churches (Note: As of February 2023, the autocephaly was recognised by the Antiochian Orthodox Church, the Bulgarian Orthodox Church, Orthodox Church of the Czech Lands and Slovakia, the Polish Orthodox Church, the Romanian Orthodox Church, the Russian Orthodox Church, the Serbian Orthodox Church and the Orthodox Church of Ukraine.)
- Separated from: Serbian Orthodox Church (SOC)
- Members: 1,350,000
- Official website: www.mpc.org.mk

The Macedonian Orthodox Church – Archdiocese of Ohrid (MOC-AO; Macedonian: Македонска православна црква – Охридска архиепископија, МПЦ-ОА, romanized: Makedonska pravoslavna crkva – Ohridska arhiepiskopija, MPC-OA), simply the Macedonian Orthodox Church (MOC) or the Archdiocese of Ohrid (AO), is an autocephalous Eastern Orthodox church in North Macedonia. The Macedonian Orthodox Church claims ecclesiastical jurisdiction over North Macedonia, and is also represented in the Macedonian diaspora. The primate of the Macedonian Orthodox Church is Stefan Veljanovski, the Metropolitan of Skopje and Archbishop of Ohrid and Macedonia.

In 1959, the Holy Synod of the Serbian Orthodox Church granted autonomy to the Macedonian Orthodox Church in the then-Socialist Republic of Macedonia, as the restoration of the historic Archbishopric of Ohrid; the MOC was united with the Serbian Orthodox Church (SOC) as a part of the SOC. In 1967, on the bicentennial anniversary of the abolition of the Archbishopric of Ohrid, the Macedonian Holy Synod unilaterally announced its autocephaly from the Serbian Orthodox Church. The Serbian synod denounced the decision and condemned the clergy as schismatic. Thenceforth, the Macedonian Church had remained unrecognised by all mainstream Eastern Orthodox churches for 55 years.

In May 2022, the Ecumenical Patriarchate of Constantinople received the hierarchy, clergy and faithful of the church in North Macedonia into Eucharistic communion, ending its ecclesiastical schism with the Patriarchate. The Ecumenical Patriarchate referred to the church as the "Church of Ohrid" and explicitly excluded the use of "Macedonian" or other derivatives of "Macedonia" in its designation. The schism between the Serbian and Macedonian churches ended, while the MOC was restored as an autonomous part of the Serbian church according to its 1959 status. Afterwards, the Serbian Orthodox Church officially granted autocephaly to the MOC, though not all autocephalous churches have recognised this autocephaly.

== History ==
=== Archbishopric of Ohrid and national churches ===
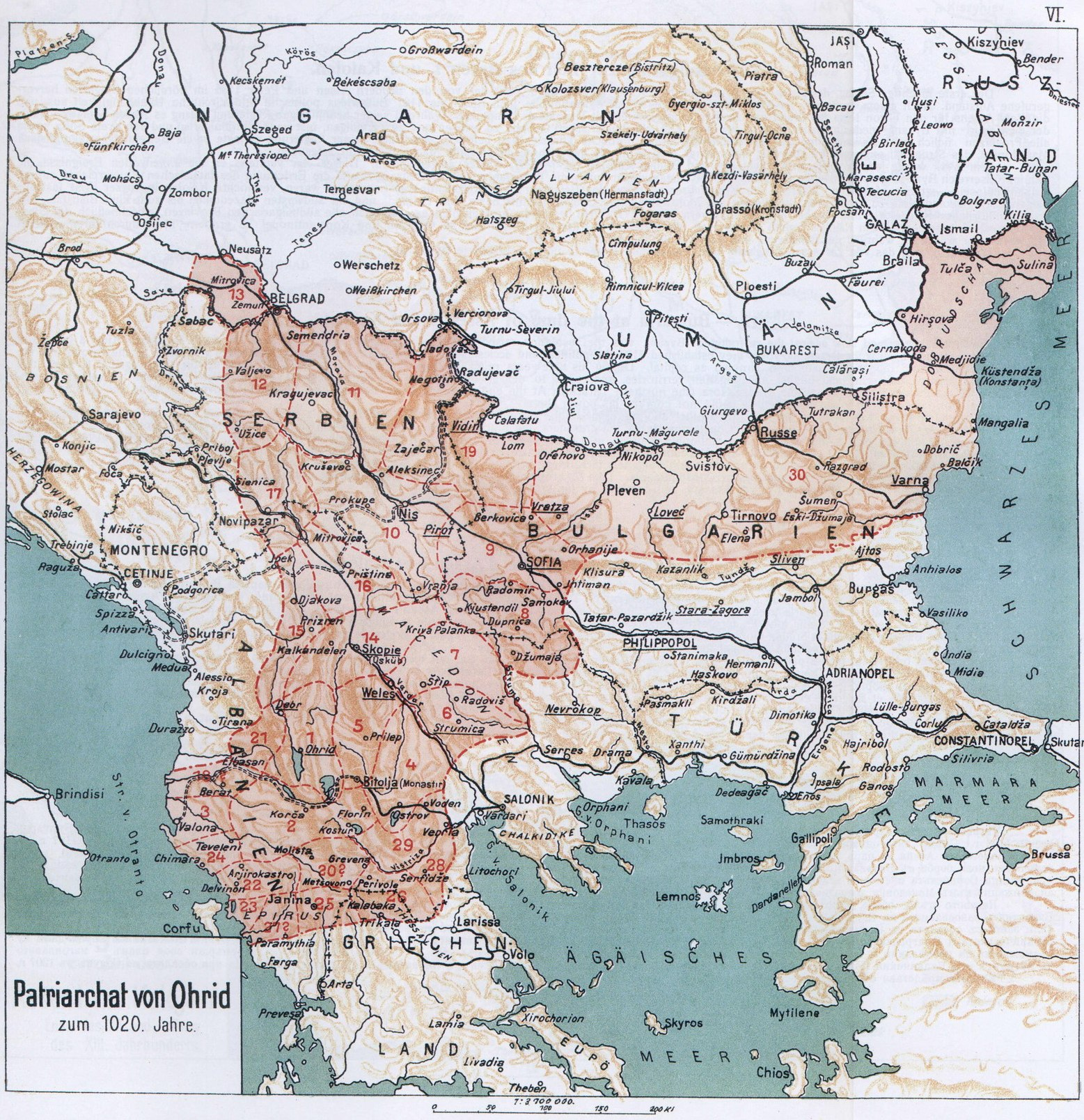
The Archbishopric of Ohrid c. 1020

Following the fall of the First Bulgarian Empire, Byzantine Emperor Basil II acknowledged the autocephalous status of the Bulgarian Orthodox Church and set up its boundaries, dioceses, property and other privileges. The Archbishopric was seated in Ohrid in the Byzantine theme of Bulgaria and was established in 1019 by lowering the rank of the autocephalous Bulgarian Patriarchate and its subjugation to the jurisdiction of the Patriarchate of Constantinople.

In 1767, the Ohrid Archbishopric was abolished by the Ottoman authorities and annexed to the Ecumenical Patriarchate of Constantinople.

During the Bulgarian National awakening, efforts were made in Ottoman Macedonia for the restoration of a Bulgarian church in the region separate from the Greek Patriarchate, and in 1870, the Bulgarian Exarchate was created. The Christian population of the bishoprics of Skopje and Ohrid voted in 1874 overwhelmingly in favour of joining the Exarchate. The Bulgarian Exarchate became in control of most of the Macedonian region. As a Bulgarian bishop of Skopje, Theodosius of Skopje, attempted to restore the Ohrid Archbishopric as a separate Macedonian church in 1890 but failed.

Following Vardar Macedonia's incorporation into Kingdom of Serbia in 1913 after the Second Balkan War, several of the Bulgarian Exarchate's dioceses were forcefully taken over by the Serbian Orthodox Church as part of the policy of Serbianisation. While the region was occupied by Bulgaria during World War I, the local dioceses temporarily came under the control of the Bulgarian Exarchate. After the war, as part of the policy of Serbianisation by the Kingdom of Serbs, Croats and Slovenes, Exarchist clerics and teachers were expelled, who were replaced mostly by Serbs and also local Serbophiles. In the interwar period, the dioceses were part of the Serbian Orthodox Church. During World War II in Vardar Macedonia, the dioceses were again temporarily under the control of the Bulgarian Exarchate under Bulgarian occupation.

=== Background ===
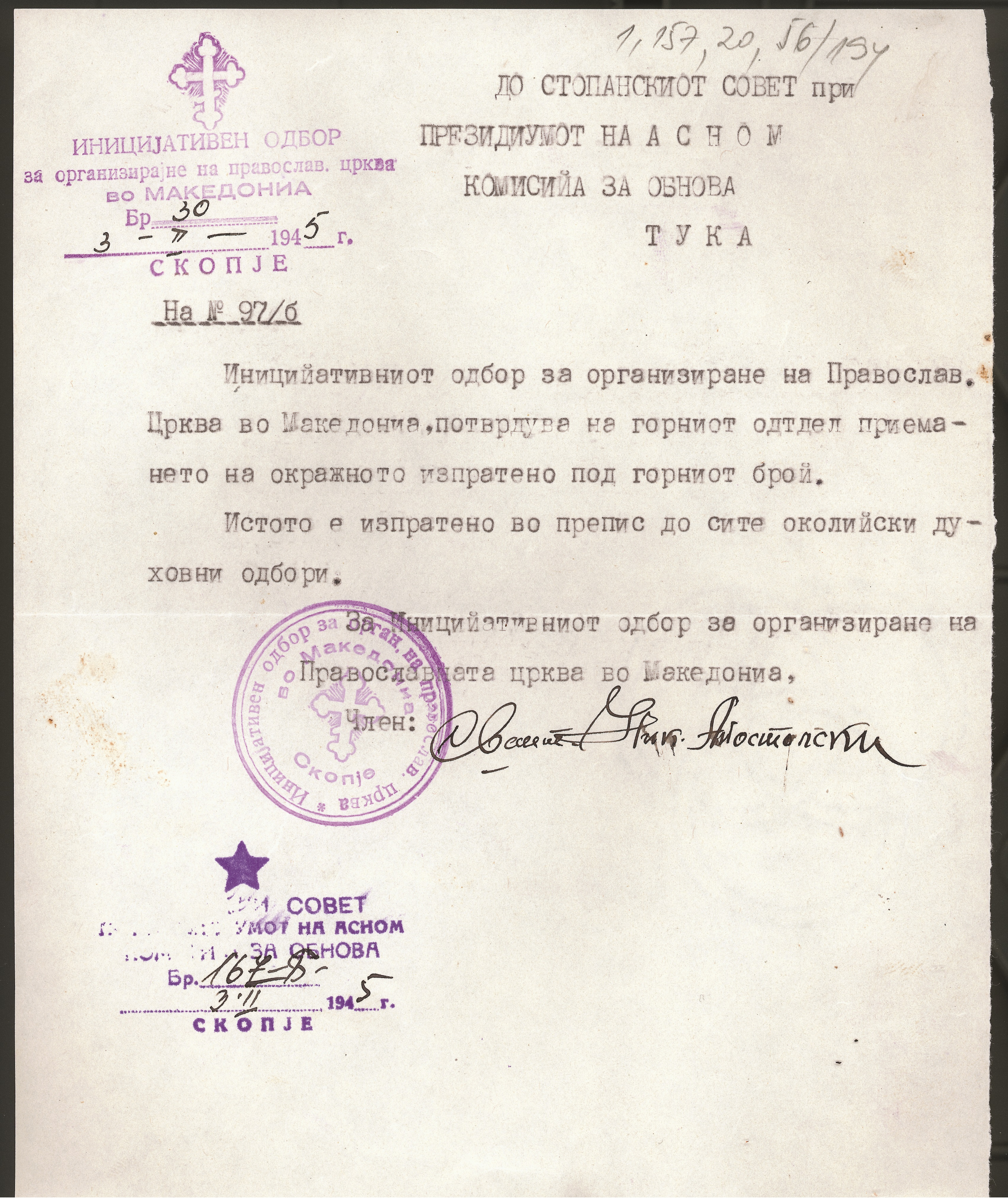
Letter from Initiative board addressed to Presidium of ASNOM, asking to organise an independent Macedonian Orthodox church, February 1945

The first modern assembly of Macedonian clergy was held in the village of Izdeglavje near Ohrid in 1943. It was sponsored by the High Command of the Macedonian Partisans who created a Bureau of Religious Affairs and appointed Veljo Mančevski to be the Commissioner at the Headquarters of the Partisan Detachments and be in charge of religious affairs. In October 1944, an initiative board for the organisation of the Macedonian Orthodox Church was officially formed. In 1945, the first clergy and people's synod met and adopted a resolution for the restoration of the Ohrid Archbishopric as a Macedonian Orthodox Church. It was submitted to the Serbian Orthodox Church. The resolution was rejected, but a later one, submitted in 1958 at the second synod, was accepted on 17 June 1959, by the Serbian Orthodox Church. On 4 October 1958, Dimitrije Stojković was uncanonically appointed as the first archbishop of Ohrid and Metropolitan of Macedonia under the name Dositej II (Dositheus II).

=== Self-proclaimed autocephaly ===
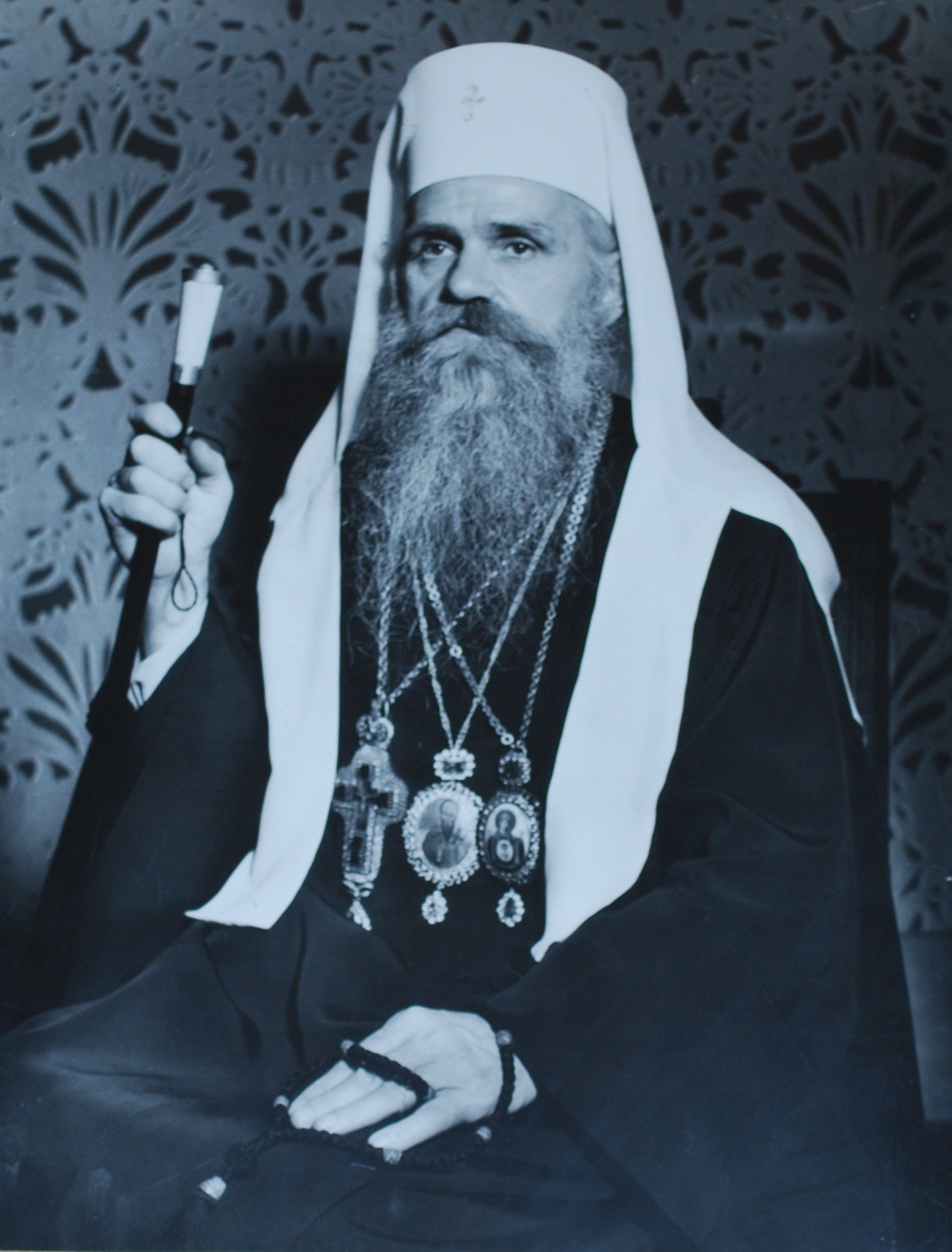
Dositej II, the first head of the MOC

In May 1966, MOC requested autocephaly from the Serbian Bishops' Council but the Council refused to forward the request to sister Orthodox churches. At the time, the Serbian church had the support and protection of Yugoslav politician Aleksandar Ranković, until his dismissal from all positions in July 1966. After this, MOC sent a demand to the Council for autocephaly and threatened to act unilaterally if it was not granted. The Council declined the demand on 24 May 1967. As a result, at its third synod on 17–19 July 1967, on the bicentennial anniversary of the abolition of the Archbishopric of Ohrid, the Macedonian Church proclaimed its autocephaly (full administrative independence) unilaterally. Serbian Church bishops denounced the decision and condemned the clergy as schismatic. The League of Communists of Macedonia welcomed the proclamation. For all the subsequent efforts to gain recognition, the autocephaly of the Macedonian Church was not recognised by other canonical Eastern Orthodox churches, due to opposition from the SOC. It applied to be part of the World Council of Churches in 1967 but Serbian patriarch German vetoed the admission. In 1981, there were 6 dioceses in Yugoslavia, one in Australia, and one in Canada; 225 parishes, 102 monasteries, around 250 priests, and 15 monks under the jurisdiction of MOC. The Catholic Church maintained ties with MOC and the latter established annual May commemorations at Saint Cyril's tomb in Rome.

Since the breakup of Yugoslavia in the 1990s, the Serbian Patriarchate had sought to restore its control over the Macedonian Church. MOC was introduced into the Macedonian constitution on 17 November 1991. In 2001, MOC demanded a military solution to the insurgency in Macedonia. The Islamic Religious Community of Macedonia accused MOC of "promoting civil war and bloodshed."

The Orthodox Ohrid Archbishopric under the SOC, which had split from MOC, was created in the 2000s and was led by Jovan Vraniškovski. The later chain of events turned into a vicious circle of mutual accusations and incidents involving the Serbian Orthodox Church and, partly, the Serbian government on one side, and the MOC, backed by the Macedonian government on the other. Vraniškovski complained of a new state-backed media campaign against his church. The government denied registration to his organisation, and launched a criminal case against him. He was removed from his bishopric, arrested, and later sentenced to 18 months in prison, and had "extremely limited visitation rights".

In turn, the Serbian Church denied a Macedonian delegation access to the monastery of Prohor Pčinjski, which was the usual site of Macedonian celebration of the national holiday of Ilinden (literally meaning St. Elijah Day) on 2 August and the site where the First Session of ASNOM was held. Macedonian border police often denied Serbian priests entry into the country in clerical garb. On 12 November 2009, the Macedonian Orthodox Church added "Archdiocese of Ohrid" to its official name and changed its coat of arms and flag.

=== Recognition efforts ===
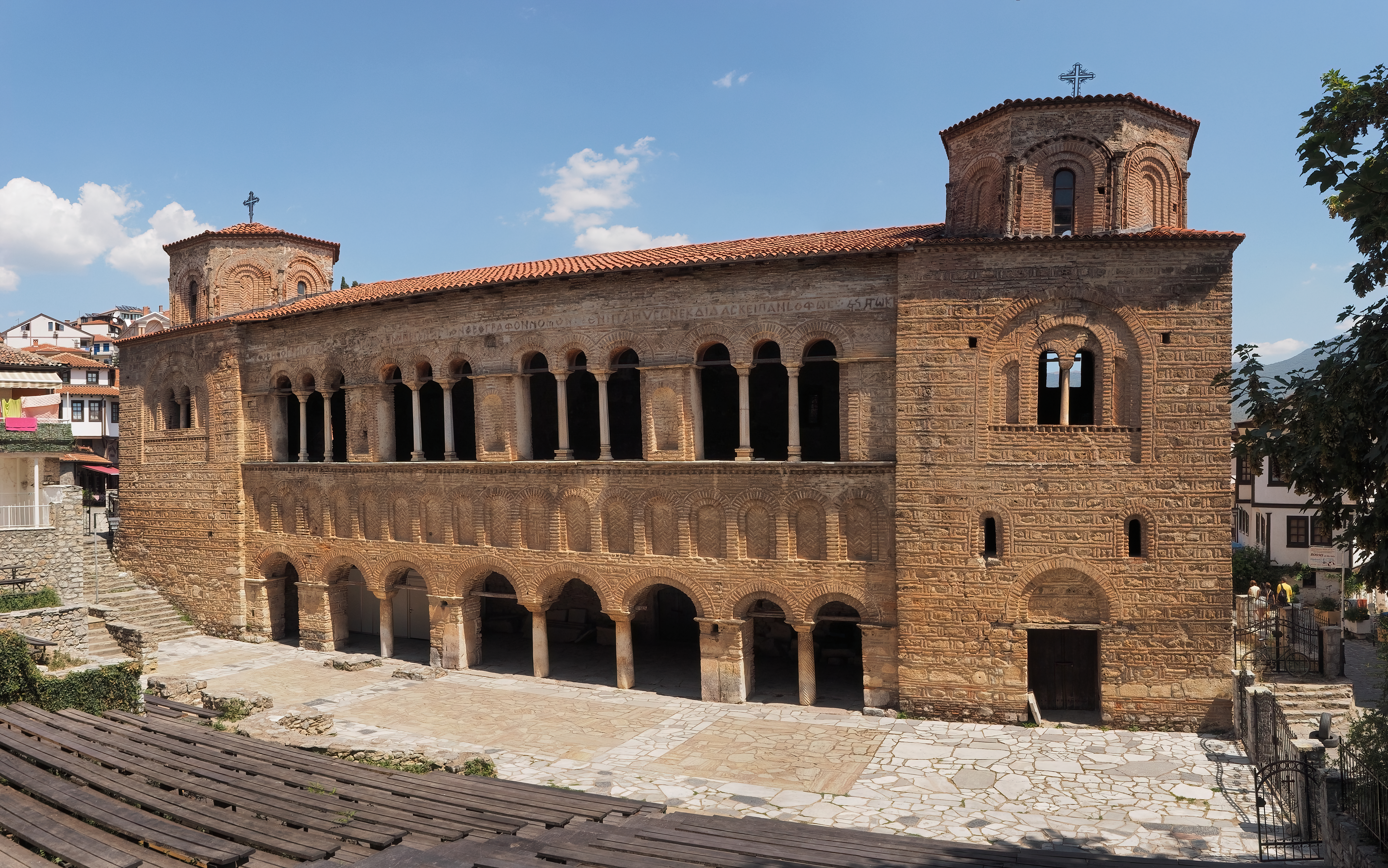
Church of St. Sophia, Ohrid of the Archbishopric of Ohrid, which is depicted on the church's coat of arms

In November 2017, Bulgarian National Television announced the content of a letter that the MOC had sent to the Holy Synod of the Bulgarian Orthodox Church requesting talks on recognition of the Macedonian Orthodox Church. The letter was signed by Archbishop Stefan Veljanovski. Among other things, the letter stated: "The Bulgarian Orthodox Church - Bulgarian Patriarchate, taking into account the unity of the Orthodox Church and the real spiritual and pastoral needs, should establish eucharistic unity with the restored Ohrid Archbishopric in the face of the Macedonian Orthodox Church". On 27 November, the Holy Synod of the Bulgarian patriarchate accepted the proposal that it become Macedonia's mother church and agreed to work towards recognition of its status. The Serbian Church expressed its surprise over the Bulgarian decision to be "mother" to the Macedonian Church.

On 14 May 2018, the Bulgarian Orthodox Church declined the invitation from the Macedonian Orthodox Church to participate in the festivities celebrating the 1000th anniversary of the establishment of the Archbishopric of Ohrid. They also declined to send a representative to the celebration. In late May 2018, the Ecumenical Patriarchate of Constantinople accepted the request from MOC to examine its canonical status.

On 13 January 2020, the Ecumenical Patriarch Bartholomew received North Macedonia's prime minister Oliver Spasovski and his predecessor Zoran Zaev. According to the Ecumenical Patriarchate's statement, "The purpose of the visit was to examine the ecclesiastical problem of the country. The previous stages of the matter were discussed during the meeting." It was announced that the patriarch would invite both the Serbian Orthodox Church and the Macedonian Orthodox Church to a joint meeting in a bid to find a mutually acceptable solution to the country's ecclesiastical issue. In September 2020, the President of North Macedonia, Stevo Pendarovski, wrote a letter to the Ecumenical Patriarch, asking him to recognise the MOC.

=== Communion with mainstream Eastern Orthodoxy ===
On 9 May 2022, the Holy Synod of the Ecumenical Patriarchate recognised the Macedonian Orthodox Church, its hierarchy and faithful, and established eucharistic communion with it. It also stated that it recognised the MOC's jurisdiction as being over North Macedonia. However, the Ecumenical Patriarchate explicitly refused to recognise the word "Macedonia" or any other derivative to designate the church, and stated it would recognise it as the "Church of Ohrid". The Holy Synod also stated it was the role of the Serbian Orthodox Church to settle the administrative issues the Serbian Church had with the MOC. The decision of the Ecumenical Patriarchate was welcomed by North Macedonia's Prime Minister, Dimitar Kovačevski. After the Ecumenical Patriarchate announced communion with the MOC, the Russian Orthodox Church came to the conclusion that it recognised only the canonical rights of the Serbian Orthodox Church and refused to recognise MOC's jurisdiction over North Macedonia.

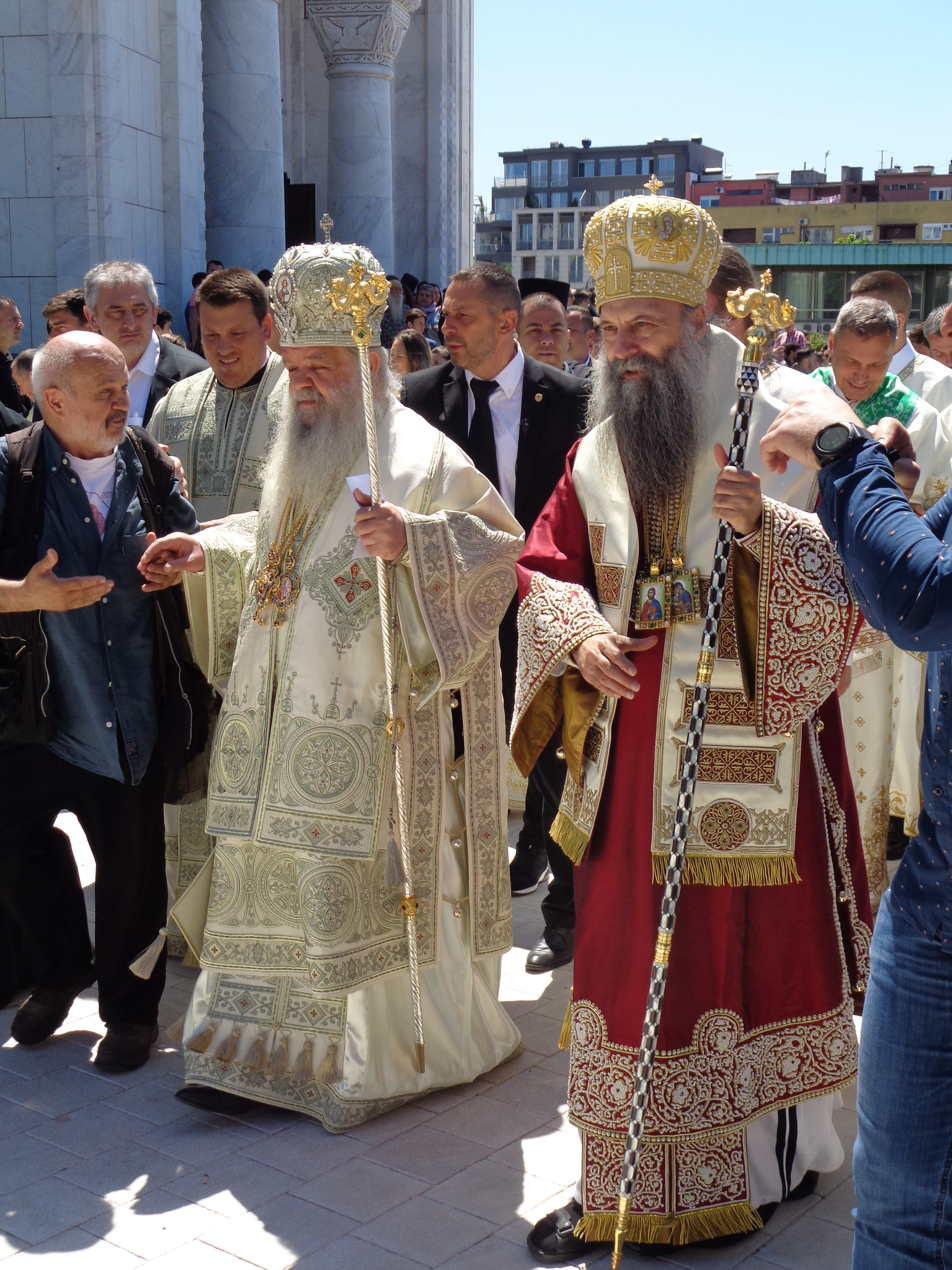
Archbishop Stefan (left) in Belgrade with Patriarch Porfirije (right) on 19 May 2022.

On 16 May, the Holy Synod of the Serbian Orthodox Church released a statement that the situation of the MOC was resolved. The Holy Synod stated that full ecclesiastical autonomy was restored to the MOC under the Patriarchate of Serbia, bringing the MOC-OA fully into communion with the mainstream Eastern Orthodox world.

=== Recognised autocephaly ===
On 24 May 2022, the feast of saints Cyril and Methodius, during a liturgy presided by both primates of the MOC-OA and the Serbian Orthodox Church in Skopje, Patriarch Porfirije of the Serbian Church announced to the faithful that "the Holy Synod of the Serbian Orthodox Church has unanimously met the pleas of the Macedonian Orthodox Church and has accepted and recognised its autocephaly." During this liturgy, the primate of the MOC-OA stated he considered the Mother Church of the MOC to be the Ecumenical Patriarchate.

On 5 June 2022, during a concelebration of the Divine Liturgy in Belgrade between the SOC and the MOC, Patriarch Porfirije of Serbia gave a tomos of autocephaly to Archbishop Stefan. On the same day, Archbishop Stefan stated that he only recognised autocephaly that is granted from the Ecumenical Patriarchate, in accordance, he stated, with canon law. The formal statement from the MOC released the following day explained that it viewed the document it had received from the SOC as a mere "recommendation [...] of autocephaly".

On 8 June 2022, the Church of Greece agreed to recognise the canonicity of the MOC, but has objected to the inclusion of the term "Macedonian" in the church's title, as well as the fact that its tomos was granted by the SOC instead of the Ecumenical Patriarchate. The question of whether the right to grant autocephaly remains with a respective church's mother church or the Ecumenical Patriarchate is part of a long-lasting and serious debate within the Orthodox world.

On 10 June 2022, on a visit to Istanbul, Archbishop Stefan was handed the Patriarchal and Synodal Act confirming the canonical and liturgical unity with the Church of Constantinople. On 12 June, the Ecumenical Patriarch Bartholomew and Archbishop Stefan concelebrated the Divine Liturgy at the Church of St. George in the Phanar. Present at this liturgy was a delegation of the Government of North Macedonia: the prime minister of North Macedonia, Dimitar Kovačevski, the Minister of Foreign Affairs, Bujar Osmani, the Minister of Defence, Slavjanka Petrovska, and the Minister of Internal Affairs, Oliver Spasovski; also present was a delegation of the Interparliamentary Assembly on Orthodoxy led by its General Secretary Maximos Charakopoulos. After this liturgy, Kovačevski was received by the Ecumenical Patriarch in a private audience; Kovačevski thanked the Ecumenical Patriarch for his decision of recognising the MOC, and stated the Patriarch had corrected a historical injustice by doing so.

On 22 June 2022, the Bulgarian Orthodox Church established communion with the MOC. On 25 August 2022, the Russian Orthodox Church established communion with the MOC and formally recognised it as autocephalous.

The autocephaly of the MOC was then formally recognised by the Polish Orthodox Church in October 2022, the Orthodox Church of Ukraine in November 2022, the Bulgarian Orthodox Church in December 2022, and the Romanian Orthodox Church and Orthodox Church of the Czech Lands and Slovakia in February 2023. However, the Bulgarian Orthodox Church has objected to the inclusion of "Archdiocese of Ohrid" in the MOC's name, as it understands itself as the continuation of the Archbishopric of Ohrid.

In addition to the Church of Greece and the Ecumenical Patriarchate, the canonicity of the MOC was recognised by the Patriarchate of Antioch in October 2022, and the Georgian and Albanian Orthodox churches in February 2023. The church has also concelebrated with the Patriarchate of Jerusalem, whose synod have not formally addressed the issue of its canonicity or its autocephaly as of March 2023.

As of March 2023, the MOC has neither concelebrated with nor has its canonicity and autocephaly been recognised by the Patriarchate of Alexandria and the Church of Cyprus. In March 2023, the Synod of the MOC decided "not to concelebrate with the hierarchy of the Orthodox Church of Ukraine until the full resolution of its status in the fullness of Orthodoxy". In the same month, metropolitan Petar along with the political party Desna ("The Right") started collecting signatures for a Declaration "for preserving the name of the Macedonian Orthodox Church – Ohrid Archbishopric." Per the document, the "change of its name, status and dignity is high treason of MOC-OA, the Macedonian people and the state of Macedonia!" In June, the church assigned dioceses to the former SOC's hierarchs, who were part of the Orthodox Ohrid Archbishopric.

In May 2024, the Macedonian Orthodox Church rejected the Ecumenical Patriarchate of Constantinople's final conditions for its independence. It has not received any official decree for its recognition. MOC did not agree to change its name, dropping "Macedonian" from it to secure such a decree.

On 21 May 2025, the Holy Synod of the Orthodox Church in America, at the request of patriarch Porfirije of Serbia, officially recognised the canonicity of the Macedonian Orthodox Church-Ohrid Archbishopric.

== Activism ==
The church protested against laws on gender equality and registries, whose protest was attended by people with religious symbols, Kutlesh flag and Russian flags, as well as members of the Russian motorcycle club Night Wolves. The protest was also supported by other religious communities in North Macedonia. The Platform for Gender Equality and the Network for Protection against Discrimination condemned MOC's involvement. Per North Macedonia's president Stevo Pendarovski, based on information from NATO, people from MOC's Synod cooperated with Russian secret services.

Metropolitan Kyrillos of the Ecumenical Patriarchate challenged the validity of the tomos of autocephaly granted by the Serbian church and accused it of having a pro-Russian orientation. In September 2024, the leadership of the church expressed its support for the Ukrainian Orthodox Church after legislation was brought into force in Ukraine, which banned religious organisations linked to the Russian Orthodox Church from operating there.

== Organisation ==
Map of the eight dioceses of North Macedonia (2013-2023)

=== Dioceses on the territory of North Macedonia ===
1. Diocese of Skopje, headed by Archbishop Stefan;
2. Diocese of Tetovo and Gostivar, headed by Metropolitan Joseph;
3. Diocese of Kumanovo and Osogovo, headed by Metropolitan Grigorij;
4. Diocese of Debar and Kičevo, headed by Metropolitan Georgij;
5. Diocese of Prespa and Pelagonia, headed by Metropolitan Peter;
6. Diocese of Strumica, headed by Metropolitan Naum;
7. Diocese of Bregalnica, headed by Metropolitan Hilarion;
8. Diocese of Povardarie, headed by Metropolitan Agathangel;
9. Diocese of Kruševo and Demir Hisar, headed by Metropolitan Jovan;
10. Diocese of Deljadrovci-Ilinden, headed by Metropolitan Joachim;
11. Diocese of Delčevo and Makedonska Kamenica, headed by Metropolitan Mark.

=== Diaspora dioceses ===
1. American-Canadian Diocese, headed by Metropolitan Methodius
2. European Diocese, headed by Metropolitan Pimen
3. Diocese of Australia and New Zealand, administered by Bishop Nikola (Trajkovski), headquarters in Melbourne.
4. Diocese of Australia and Sydney, see currently vacant, headquarters in Sydney.

Outside the country, the church is active in 4 dioceses in the Macedonian diaspora. The 12 dioceses of the church are governed by ten Episcopes, with around 500 active priests in about 500 parishes with over 2000 churches and monasteries. The church claims jurisdiction of about twenty living monasteries, with more than 100 monks.

=== Titular bishops ===
- David, titular Bishop of Dremvit, vicar bishop of the Diocese of Skopje.

== See also ==
- List of churches in North Macedonia
- Macedonian Greek Catholic Church
