= Čučer-Sandevo Municipality =

Municipality of North Macedonia

Coordinates: 42.11°N 21.38°E

Čučer-Sandevo Municipality Општина Чучер-Сандево
- Rural municipality
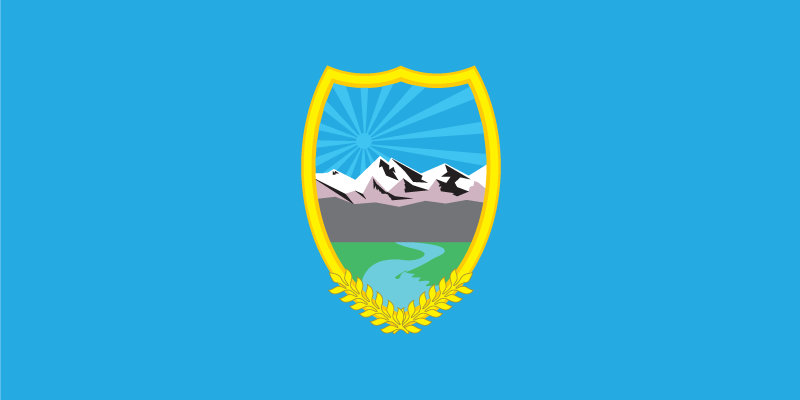
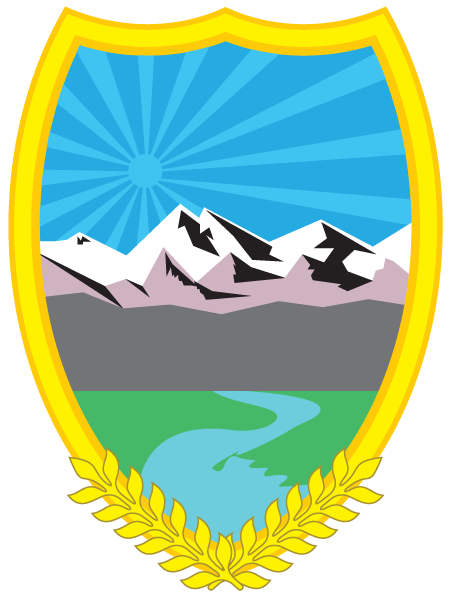
- Flag Coat of arms

- Country: North Macedonia
- Region: Skopje
- Municipal Seat: Čučer-Sandevo

Government
  - Mayor: Zoran Bajovski (VMRO DPMNE)

Area
  - Total: 240.78 km^{2} (92.97 sq mi)

Population
  - Total: 9,200
  - Density: 38/km^{2} (99/sq mi)

Languages
  - primary: Macedonian
  - secondary: Serbian
- Time zone: UTC+1 (CET)
  - Summer (DST): UTC+2 (CEST)
- Postal code: 1011
- Area code: +389 02
- Vehicle registration: SK

Čučer-Sandevo Municipality (Macedonian: Чучер-Сандево), is a municipality in northern part of North Macedonia. Čučer-Sandevo is also the name of the village where the municipal seat is found. It is located in the Skopje Statistical Region.

== Geography ==
The municipality borders

- Kosovo to the west and north,
- the City of Skopje to the south and
- Lipkovo Municipality to the east.

== Demographics ==
Settlements in Čučer-Sandevo Municipality

According to the 2021 North Macedonia census, Čučer-Sandevo Municipality has 9,200 inhabitants.

Ethnic groups in the municipality:

Demographics of Čučer-Sandevo Municipality
Census year	Population
1994	8,064
2002	8,493
2021	9,200

	2002		2021	
	Number	%	Number	%
TOTAL	8,493	100	9,200	100
Macedonians	4,019	47.32	5,032	54.7
Serbs	2,426	28.56	1,932	21
Albanians	1,943	22.88	1,224	13.3
Bosniaks	1	0.01	84	0.91
Roma	23	0.27	23	0.25
Vlachs	16	0.18	16	0.17
Turks			14	0.15
Other / Undeclared / Unknown	65	0.78	111	1.22
Persons for whom data are taken from administrative sources			764	8.3
