= List of churches in the Macedonian Orthodox Diocese of America and Canada =

The Macedonian Orthodox Diocese of America and Canada (Macedonian: Американско-канадска епархија, romanized: Amerikansko-kanadska eparhija) is one of 10 dioceses of the Macedonian Orthodox Church and one of three located outside of North Macedonia. It was initially established in 1967 for Macedonian diaspora communities in Canada, the United States, and Australia. In 1981, the diocese was split into two parts: one diocese for Australia and New Zealand and another for Canada and the United States. The American and Canadian diocese is further subdivided into three parts, or "regencies": one for the Eastern United States, one for the Midwestern United States, and one for Canada. It consists of roughly 15,000 adherents and 40 churches, monasteries, and parishes.

== List ==
=== Eastern American churches ===
| Name | Dedication | Location | Founded | Notes | Image | Ref(s) |
|---|---|---|---|---|---|---|
| St. Clement of Ohrid | Clement of Ohrid | New York City, New York | 1987 | | | |
| St. Dimitrij | Demetrius of Thessaloniki | Miami, Florida | 2000 | | | |
| St. Dimitrija | Demetrius of Thessaloniki | Rochester, New York | 1978 | | | |
| St. George | Saint George | Randolph, New Jersey | 1984 | First Macedonian Orthodox monastery in North America | | |
| St. George | Saint George | Syracuse, New York | 1968 | | | |
| St. John the Baptist | John the Baptist | Tarpon Springs, Florida | 1999 | | | |
| Sts. Kiril and Metodij | Cyril and Methodius | Blasdell, New York | 1975 | Organizes an annual Macedonian cultural festival | | |
| Sts. Kiril and Metodij | Cyril and Methodius | Cedar Grove, New Jersey | 1974 | Originally located in Passaic, New Jersey. Burnt down in 1980, later reopened in Cedar Grove. | | |
| St. Naum of Ohrid | Saint Naum | Philadelphia, Pennsylvania | 1993 | | | |
| St. Nicholas | Saint Nicholas | Totowa, New Jersey | 1994 | | | |

=== Midwestern American churches ===
| Name | Dedication | Location | Founded | Notes | Image | Ref(s) |
|---|---|---|---|---|---|---|
| St. Clement of Ohrid | Clement of Ohrid | Avon, Ohio | 1986 | | | |
| St. George of Kratovo | George of Kratovo | Farmington Hills, Michigan | 1993 | | | |
| St. Ilija | Elijah | Cincinnati, Ohio | 1978 | | | |
| Sts. Kiril and Metodij | Cyril and Methodius | Hinsdale, Illinois | 1981 | | | |
| St. Mary | Mary, mother of Jesus | Reynoldsburg, Ohio | 1965 | | | |
| St. Mary | Mary, mother of Jesus | Sterling Heights, Michigan | 1975 | | | |
| St. Nicholas | Saint Nicholas | North Canton, Ohio | - | | | |
| Sts. Petar and Pavle | Saint Peter and Paul the Apostle | Crown Point, Indiana | 1963 | First Macedonian Orthodox church in North America | | |
| St. Petka | Paraskeva of the Balkans | Chicago, Illinois | 1993 | | | |

=== Canadian churches ===
| Name | Dedication | Location | Founded | Notes | Image | Ref(s) |
|---|---|---|---|---|---|---|
| St. Clement of Ohrid | Clement of Ohrid | Toronto, Ontario | 1965 | First Macedonian Orthodox church in Canada | | |
| St. Dimitrija Solunski | Demetrius of Thessaloniki | Markham, Ontario | 1993 | Features a large mural by artist Georgi Danevski | | |
| St. Ilija | Elijah | Mississauga, Ontario | 1979 | Parish founded in 1979. Moved into an art gallery in 1997. (Note: The gallery was formerly St. Joseph's Roman Catholic Church, the second oldest church building in Ontario.) Victim of an arson attack in 2000, destroying a section of the church. A new church building was completed in 2004. | | |
| St. Mary | Mary, mother of Jesus | Cambridge, Ontario | 1987 | | | |
| St. Naum of Ohrid | Saint Naum | Hamilton, Ontario | 1970 | | | |
| St. Nedela | Nedela | Ajax, Ontario | 1993 | | | |
| St. Nicholas | Saint Nicholas | LaSalle, Ontario | 1979 | Burnt down in 1980, later reconstructed | | |

== Sources ==
- Cepreganov, Todor; Angelovska-Panova, Maja; Zajkovski, Dragan (2014). "The Macedonian Orthodox Church". In Leustean, Lucian N. (ed.). Eastern Christianity and politics in the twenty-first century. New York: Routledge. pp. 526–438. ISBN 978-1-315-81903-7.
- Katin, Slavé (2018). Macedonians in the World. Skopje: Makedonska Iskra. ISBN 978-608-202-064-8.
- Krindatch, Alexei, ed. (2011). Atlas of American Orthodox Christian churches. Brookline: Holy Cross Orthodox Press. ISBN 978-1-935317-23-4.
- Michaelidis, Gregory (2005). Salvation Abroad: Macedonian Migration To North America and The Making of Modern Macedonia 1870 1970 (Doctoral thesis). College Park: University of Maryland.
