= St. Clement of Ohrid Macedonian Orthodox Cathedral, Toronto =

Cathedral in Toronto

St. Clement of Ohrid
- View of St. Clement of Ohrid Cathedral
- St. Clement of Ohrid
- 43.70857°N 79.34108°W
- Location: 76 Overlea Boulevard; Toronto, Ontario; M4H 1C5
- Denomination: Macedonian Orthodox Church
- Website: www.stclementofohrid.com

History
- Founded: 1965

Administration
- Diocese: America and Canada

Clergy
- Priest(s): Very Rev. Aleksandar Todorovski; Rev. Sasho Celeski

St. Clement of Ohrid (Macedonian: Св. Климент Охридски) in Toronto, Ontario, Canada, is the first Macedonian Orthodox Church in Canada and one of the oldest in the Macedonian Orthodox Diocese of America and Canada.

In addition to church services, the church hosts several educational, cultural, and charitable organizations to preserve and promote Macedonian ethnic and cultural awareness.

== History ==
Toronto is the home to the largest concentration of Macedonian Canadians outside of the Balkans, with 43,110 Canadians who claimed full, or partial Macedonian ancestry in the 2016 Canadian census. Long before the Macedonian Orthodox Church was declared autonomous, early immigrants from Macedonia, who were largely classified as Bulgarians, founded churches that were under the jurisdiction of the Bulgarian Orthodox Church and the Bulgarian Eastern Orthodox Diocese of the USA, Canada and Australia. They are Sts. Cyril & Methody Macedono-Bulgarian Orthodox Church founded in 1910, St. George Macedono-Bulgarian Orthodox Church founded in 1941 and Holy Trinity Macedono-Bulgarian Eastern Orthodox Church founded in 1973. After the Macedonian Orthodox Church declared autonomy in 1958, many members felt the need to establish a new parish under its jurisdiction.

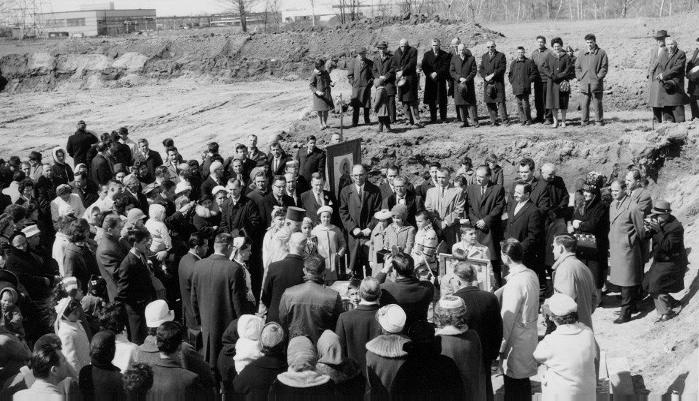
Blessing of the foundation ceremony, 1964

On 7 August 1962, members of the United Macedonians Organization held a meeting in the King Edward Hotel in Toronto and the decision was made to build a new church in the Thorncliffe Park neighbourhood which will bear the name of the medieval Saint Clement of Ohrid. After this decision was brought forth, an assembly was also formed and a church delegation was sent by the Holy Synod in Skopje, SR Macedonia. The first holy liturgy of the parish was carried out on 12 August 1962 in the "Zhelevo Hall", a community centre established by Aegean Macedonians from the village of Želevo (Antartiko). On 12 December 1962, the church received its license from the city of Toronto to officially operate religious services. On 5 April 1964, the foundations of the church were laid by the church's first priest, Rev. Kiril Stojanovski. The event was also attended by Dositheus II, Archbishop of Ohrid and Macedonia. On 18 April 1965, on the Orthodox holiday of Palm Sunday, the church was officially opened for service.

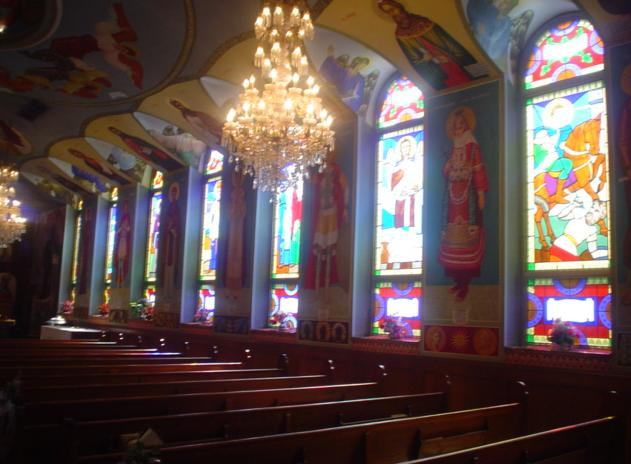
The inside of the church features murals by Georgi Danevski

The inside of the church features murals by Macedonian Canadian artist Georgi Danevski.

In February 2009, on the occasion of the 50th anniversary celebration of the United Macedonians Organization, the church was visited by the Prime Minister of Canada, Stephen Harper. In August 2009, on the occasion of the Orthodox holiday of the Domition of the Virgin Mary, the church was visited by Nikola Gruevski – the Prime Minister of then Republic of Macedonia (now North Macedonia).

== See also ==
- List of Orthodox churches in Toronto
- St. Dimitrija Solunski Macedonian Orthodox Church, Markham, Ontario
- St. Ilija Macedonian Orthodox Church, Mississauga
