= St. Nedela Macedonian Orthodox Church, Ajax, Ontario =

St. Nedela
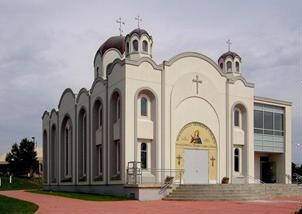
- View of St. Nedela Macedonian Orthodox Church
- St. Nedela
- 43.83954°N 79.03662°W
- Location: 485 Bayly Street West; Ajax, Ontario; L1S 6M7
- Country: Canada
- Denomination: Macedonian Orthodox Church
- Website: stnedela.org

History
- Founded: 1993
- Consecrated: September 8, 2002; 23 years ago

Architecture
- Years built: 2000–2002

Administration
- Diocese: American-Canadian

Clergy
- Pastor(s): V. Rev. Ilija Dimitrieski; Rev. Aleksandar Zasov

St. Nedela (Macedonian: Света Недела), also known as St. Sunday (Nedela), is a Macedonian Orthodox Church located in Ajax, Ontario, Canada.

== Background ==
In 1993, a group of Macedonian Canadians from the Durham Region got together and decided to establish a church for the religious needs of the Macedonians in Ajax and the surrounding areas. After many meetings, ideas, fund raising and discussions the group found a location at Bayly St and Westney Rd in Ajax. A lot of 1 hectare (2 1/2 acres) was purchased for a price of $450,000 CAD.

On May 18, 2000, the activities surrounding the construction of the new church were agreed upon. On October 10, 2000, the foundation stone was laid on the occasion of the 2000th anniversary of Christianity. This ceremony was attended by about 1000 people from Canada and the United States, and a liturgy was performed by Archbishop Stephen, Archbishop of Ohrid and Macedonia.

The church was consecrated on September 8, 2002.

As of 2020, the church managed a Macedonian community center, a banquet hall accommodating up to 250 guests, a woman's auxiliary, Sunday school and a folklore dancing group.
