= St. Dimitrija Solunski Macedonian Orthodox Church, Markham, Ontario =

St. Dimitrija Solunski
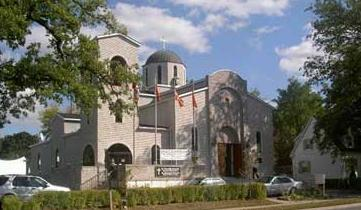
- View of St. Dimitrija Macedonian Orthodox Church
- St. Dimitrija Solunski
- 43.88204°N 79.26139°W
- Location: 201 Main St N Markham, ON; L3P 1Y4
- Country: Canada
- Denomination: Macedonian Orthodox Church
- Website: stdimitrijasolunski.com

History
- Founded: 1994

Administration
- Diocese: American-Canadian

Clergy
- Priest: Very Rev. Fr. Sasho Celeski

St. Dimitrija Solunski (Macedonian: Св. Димитриј Солунски), also known as St. Demetria of Solun, is a Macedonian Orthodox Church located in Markham, Ontario, Canada.

== History ==
Before the church was built, a Macedonian organization in the Markham region existed since 1988. In 1989, the numbers of Macedonian Canadians grew large enough to support a church environment. Actions were put forth to gather enough financial resources with the aid of many Macedonian Canadians. Enough financial resources were gathered and a property was purchased in the year of 1993.

The existing building was demolished on May 15, 1994, and the new foundation was blessed by the Archbishop of Ohrid and Macedonia Michael, who was also the Prelate for the American-Canadian Macedonian Orthodox Diocese. On the 7th of August, 1994, the first holy liturgy was carried out in the newly built church.

In the church there is a women's auxiliary, a soccer team, a church choir, a Macedonian school with religious classes, a literary club, and a senior citizens club. Within the lower level of the church building there is a banquet hall. The church also participates in annual cultural events organized by the city of Markham.

The church has large Byzantine-style frescos and iconography painted by the Macedonian artist Georgi Danevski.

== See also ==
- St. Clement of Ohrid Macedonian Orthodox Church, Toronto
- St. Ilija Macedonian Orthodox Church, Mississauga
