= St. Mary Macedonian Orthodox Church (Cambridge, Ontario) =

Nativity of the Virgin Mary
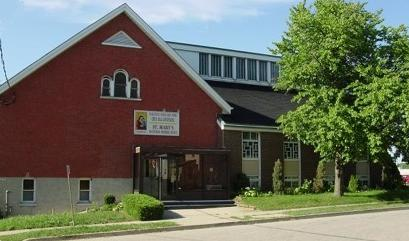
- View of St. Mary Macedonian Orthodox Church
- Nativity of the Virgin Mary
- 43.37279°N 80.31885°W
- Location: 50 Augusta St; Cambridge, Ontario
- Country: Canada
- Denomination: Macedonian Orthodox Church
- Website: stmarymoc.ca

History
- Founded: 1989

Administration
- Diocese: American-Canadian

Clergy
- Pastor: Rev. Goce Despotovski

St. Mary (Macedonian: Пресвета Богородица), also known as the "Nativity of the Virgin Mary" (Macedonian: Раѓање на Пресвета Богородица) is a Macedonian Orthodox Church located in Cambridge, Ontario, Canada.

== History ==
In 1989, fifteen Macedonian families joined to form a Macedonian organization whose purpose was to gather the Macedonian people and preserve their traditions, culture and faith. The organization's goal was to establish a church for the Macedonian communities from the areas of Cambridge, Kitchener, Waterloo and Guelph. In 1994 the group purchased a building of a former Coptic Church and during the same year the church was registered and blessed by Michael, Archbishop of Ohrid and Macedonia.
