= Archbishop of Ohrid =

The Archbishop of Ohrid is a historic title given to the primate of the Archbishopric of Ohrid. The whole original title of the primate was Archbishop of Justiniana Prima and all Bulgaria (Greek: ἀρχιεπίσκοπὴ τῆς Πρώτης Ἰουστινιανῆς καὶ πάσης Βουλγαρίας).

The archbishopric was established in 1018 by lowering of the rank of the autocephalous Bulgarian Patriarchate to the rank of archbishopric. The autocephaly of the Ohrid Archbishopric remained respected during the periods of Byzantine, Bulgarian, Serbian and Ottoman rule and continued to exist until its abolition in 1767.

Today, the primate of the Macedonian Orthodox Church is claimant to the title of Archbishop of Ohrid.

According to the statutes of the Bulgarian Orthodox Church, the current Bulgarian Patriarchate is the successor of the Ohrid Archbishopric.

== Archbishopric of Ohrid, 1018–1767 ==
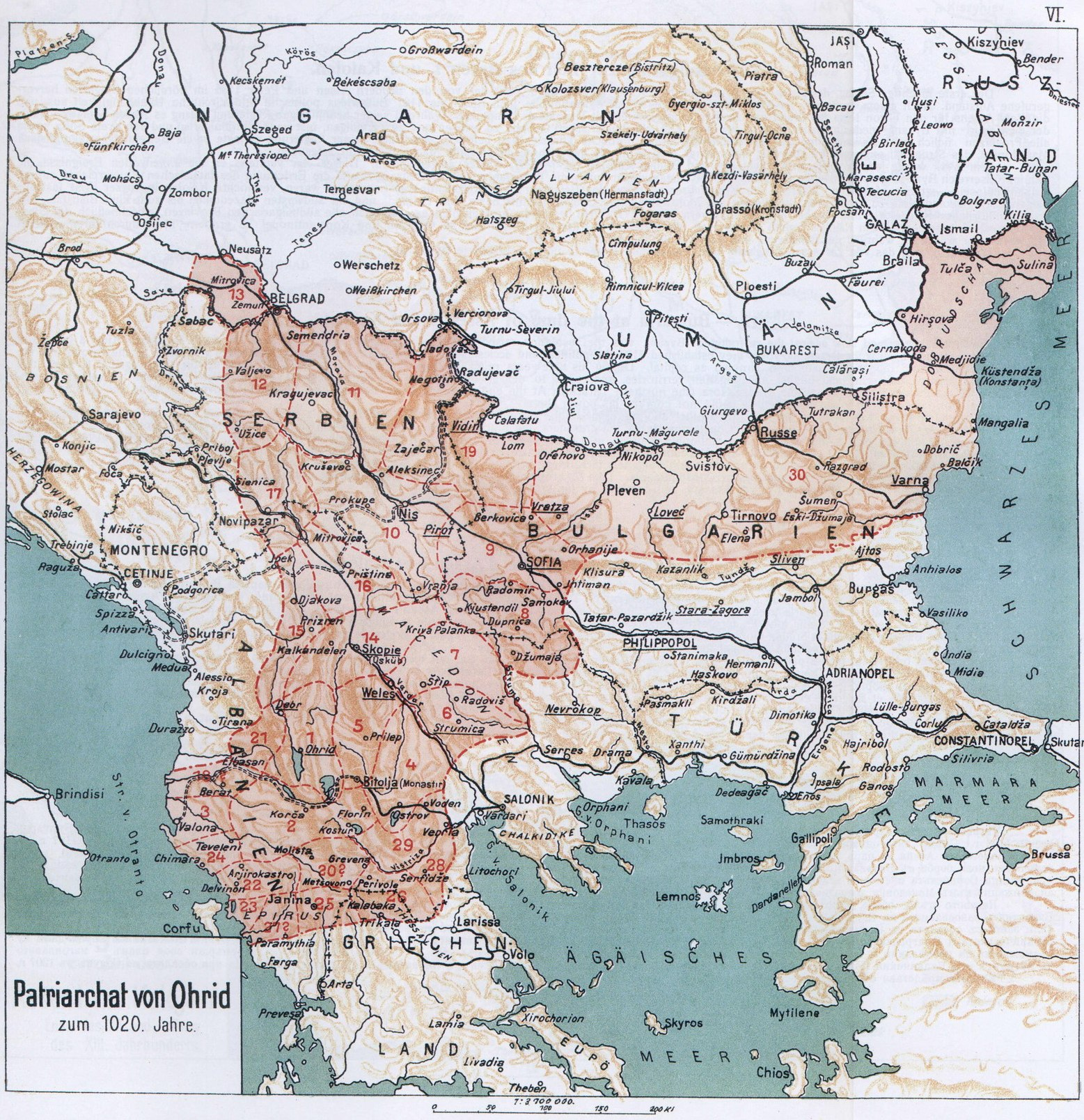
Map of the Archbishopric of Ohrid in 1020

Name	Reign	Birth Name	Title
John I of Debar	1018–1037		Archbishop of Ohrid
Leo	1037–1056		Archbishop of Ohrid
Theodulus I	1056–1065		Archbishop of Ohrid
John II Lampinos	1065–1078		Archbishop of Ohrid
John III	1078–1079		Archbishop of Ohrid
Theophylact	1084–1107		Archbishop of Ohrid
Leo II Mung	1108–1120		Archbishop of Ohrid
Michael Maximos	1120		Archbishop of Ohrid
John IV	1139/43–1160	Adrianos Komnenos	Archbishop of Ohrid
Constantine I	1160		Archbishop of Ohrid
John V Kamateros	1183–1216		Archbishop of Ohrid
Demetrios Chomatianos	1216–1234		Archbishop of Ohrid
Joannicius			Archbishop of Ohrid
Sergius			Archbishop of Ohrid
Constantine II Kabasilas	before 1255–after 1259		Archbishop of Ohrid
Jacob Proarchius	1275–1285		Archbishop of Ohrid
Hadrian			Archbishop of Ohrid
Gennadius			Archbishop of Ohrid
Macarius			Archbishop of Ohrid
Anthimos Metochites	1341–1346		Archbishop of Ohrid
Nicholas I	1346		Archbishop of Ohrid
Gregory II	1364/65		Archbishop of Ohrid
Matthew	1408		Archbishop of Ohrid
Nicodemus	1452		Archbishop of Ohrid
Dositheos I			Archbishop of Ohrid
Dorotheos	1466		Archbishop of Ohrid
Mark Xylokaravis	1466		Archbishop of Ohrid
Nicholas II			Archbishop of Ohrid
Zacharius	1486		Archbishop of Ohrid
Prochorus	1528–1550		Archbishop of Ohrid
Simeon	1550–1557		Archbishop of Ohrid
Nicanor	1557–1565		Archbishop of Ohrid
Paisius	1565		Archbishop of Ohrid
Parthenius I			Archbishop of Ohrid
Sophronius	1567–1572		Archbishop of Ohrid
Gabriel	1572–1588		Archbishop of Ohrid
Theodulus II	1588–1590		Archbishop of Ohrid
Gregory III	1590–1593		Archbishop of Ohrid
Joachim	1593–1596		Archbishop of Ohrid
Athanasius I	1596–1598		Archbishop of Ohrid
Varlaam	1598		Archbishop of Ohrid
Nectarius I	1598–1613		Archbishop of Ohrid
Metrophanes	1614–1616		Archbishop of Ohrid
Nectarius II	1616–1624		Archbishop of Ohrid
Porphyrios Palaiologos	1624–1627		Archbishop of Ohrid
George	1627–1628		Archbishop of Ohrid
Joasaph	1628–1629		Archbishop of Ohrid
Abraham Mesaps	1629–1637		Archbishop of Ohrid
Meletius I	1637–1643		Archbishop of Ohrid
Chariton	1643–1650		Archbishop of Ohrid
Daniel	1650–1652		Archbishop of Ohrid
Dionysius I	1652–1653		Archbishop of Ohrid
Athanasius II	1653		Archbishop of Ohrid
Paphnutius			Archbishop of Ohrid
Ignatius I	1660–1663		Archbishop of Ohrid
Arsenius I	1663		Archbishop of Ohrid
Zosimus	1663–1670		Archbishop of Ohrid
Panaretus	1671–1673		Archbishop of Ohrid
Nectarius III	1673–1676		Archbishop of Ohrid
Ignatius II	1676		Archbishop of Ohrid
Teophanes	1676		Archbishop of Ohrid
Meletius II	1676–1677		Archbishop of Ohrid
Parthenius II	1677–1683		Archbishop of Ohrid
Gregory IV	1683–1688		Archbishop of Ohrid
Germanus	1688–1691		Archbishop of Ohrid
Gregory V	1691–1693		Archbishop of Ohrid
Ignatius III	1693–1695; 1703–1706		Archbishop of Ohrid
Zosimus II	1695–1699; 1707–1708		Archbishop of Ohrid
Raphael	1699–1702		Archbishop of Ohrid
Germanus II	1702		Archbishop of Ohrid
Dionysius II	1706; 1709–1714		Archbishop of Ohrid
Methodius I	1708		Archbishop of Ohrid
Philotheus	1714–1718		Archbishop of Ohrid
Joasaph II	1719–1745		Archbishop of Ohrid
Joseph	1746–1752		Archbishop of Ohrid
Dionysius III	1752–1756		Archbishop of Ohrid
Methodius II	1757–1758		Archbishop of Ohrid
Cyril	1759–1762		Archbishop of Ohrid
Jeremy	1763		Archbishop of Ohrid
Ananias	1763		Archbishop of Ohrid
Arsenius II	1763–1767		Archbishop of Ohrid

== Macedonian Orthodox Church ==
=== Autonomous, 1958–1967 ===
On 4 October 1958, the Macedonian Orthodox Church was declared as the restoration of the Archbishopric of Ohrid. Archbishop Dositej II was enthroned as Archbishop of Ohrid and Macedonia, continuing in the lineage of the Archbishops of Ohrid. The declaration was retroactively accepted by the Bishops' Council of the Serbian Orthodox Church on 19 June 1959, and was celebrated in a common liturgy by Archbishop Dositej II and Serbian Patriarch German in Skopje.

In 1962, Serbian Patriarch German and Russian Patriarch Alexy I visited the Macedonian Orthodox Church on the feast of Ss. Cyril and Methodius in Ohrid. The two patriarchs and the Macedonian archbishop celebrated Holy Liturgy, marking the first occasion where the leader of the Macedonian church met with heads of other Eastern Orthodox Churches.

Name	Portrait	Reign	Birth Name	Title
Dositej II		1958–1967	Dimitrije Stojković	Archbishop of Ohrid and Macedonia

=== Autocephalous, since 1967 ===
Map of the dioceses of the Macedonian Orthodox Church between 1967 and 2013.

Map of the dioceses of the Macedonian Orthodox Church since 2013.

On 19 July 1967, in Ohrid, the Macedonian Orthodox Church declared autocephaly from the Serbian Orthodox Church, a move which was not acknowledged by the Serbian church and other Eastern Orthodox Churches.

Name	Portrait	Reign	Birth Name	Title
Dositej II		1967–1981	Dimitrije Stojković	Archbishop of Ohrid and Macedonia
Angelarij		1981–1986	Cvetko Krsteski	Archbishop of Ohrid and Macedonia
Gavril II		1986–1993	Ǵorǵi Milošev	Archbishop of Ohrid and Macedonia
Mihail		1993–1999	Metodi Gogov	Archbishop of Ohrid and Macedonia
Stefan		1999–present	Stojan Veljanovski	Archbishop of Ohrid and Macedonia

In 2022, the disagreement between the Macedonian Orthodox Church and the Serbian Orthodox Church over the self-proclaimed autocephaly of the former ended. The Macedonian Orthodox Church was recognized as autocephalous by the Ecumenical Patriarchate of Constantinople and some other Eastern Orthodox Churches.

== Serbian Orthodox Church ==
=== Orthodox Ohrid Archbishopric (autonomous), 2005–2023 ===
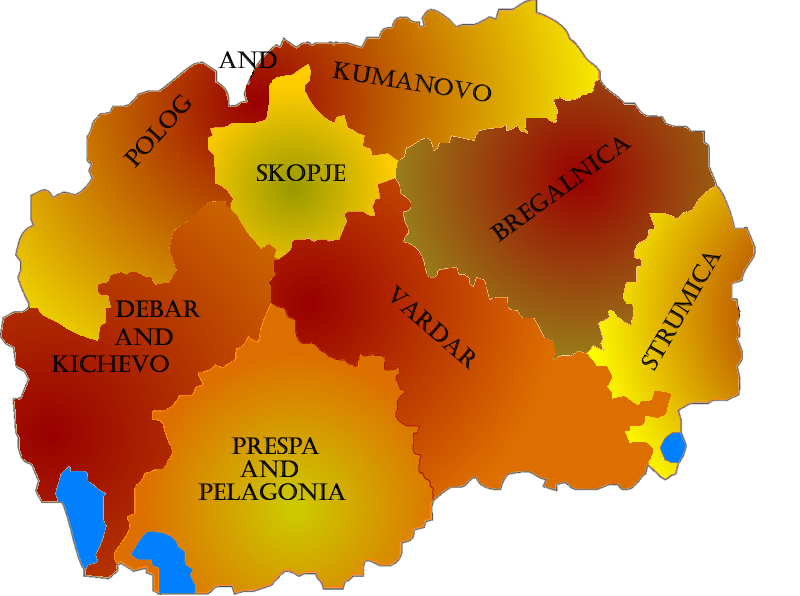
Map of the dioceses of the Orthodox Ohrid Archbishopric.

The Serbian Orthodox Church had a disagreement with the Macedonian Orthodox Church after its separation and declaration of autocephaly in 1967 and did not recognize it, along with all of the other Eastern Orthodox churches. After the negotiations between the two churches were suspended, the Macedonian church had withdrawn from the 2002 agreement where the Macedonian church would enjoy recognition as autonomous under the control of the Serbian church, the Serbian church officially recognized the group led by Jovan Vraniškovski, a former bishop of the Macedonian church, as leaders of the Archbishopric of Ohrid under the tutelage of the Serbian Patriarchate in 2005. The Serbian church recognized his group as the restoration of the Archbishopric of Ohrid and gave him the title of Jovan VI, Archbishop of Ohrid.

In 2023, after the reconciliation of the Serbian church and the Macedonian church, the Orthodox Ohrid Archbishopric was integrated into the Macedonian church. On 28 June 2023, the Holy Synod of the Orthodox Ohrid Archbishopric made an official announcement, stating that it has fulfilled its mission, and noting that its hierarchs have collectively joined the Macedonian church.

Name	Portrait	Reign	Birth Name	Title
Jovan VI		2005–2023	Zoran Vraniškovski	Archbishop of Ohrid
