= Macedonian Canadians =

Македонци во Канада
- The Saint Clement of Ohrid Macedonian Orthodox Cathedral in Toronto

Total population
- 39,440 (by ancestry, 2021 census)

Regions with significant populations
- Toronto, Ottawa, Montreal, Vancouver

Languages
- Macedonian, Canadian English

Religion
- Eastern Orthodox Church

Related ethnic groups
- Macedonian Americans, Bulgarian Canadians, Yugoslav Canadians

Macedonian Canadians (Macedonian: Канадски Македонци) are Canadian citizens of ethnic Macedonian descent, who reside in Canada. According to the 2021 census there were 39,440 Canadians who claimed full or partial Macedonian ancestry.

== History ==
=== Ethnicity and origins ===
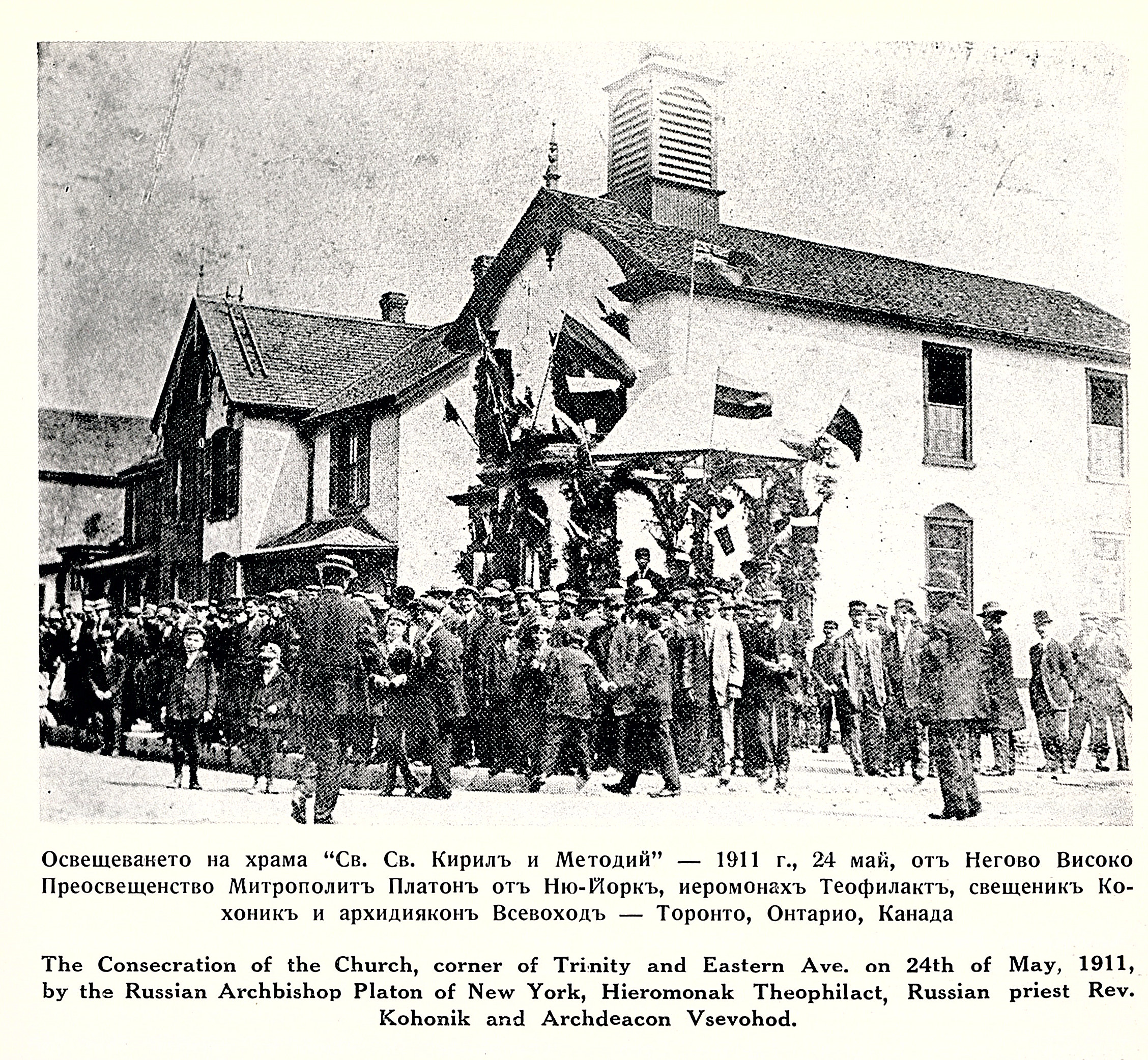
Macedono-Bulgarian Eastern Orthodox Cathedral Sts. Cyril and Methodius in Toronto, 1911

In the first half of the 20th century, most of the Macedonians were largely classified as Bulgarians or Macedono-Bulgarians. Until World War II, most people whose descendants today identify themselves as Macedonian Canadians claimed a Bulgarian ethnic identity and were recorded as part of the Bulgarian ethnic group. The term Macedonian was used as a geographic/regional term rather than an ethnic one. At that time the political organization by the Slavic immigrants from the region of Macedonia, the Macedonian Patriotic Organization, also promoted the idea of Macedonian Slavs being Bulgarians. In 1911 they established the first Macedono-Bulgarian Orthodox Church Sts. Cyril and Methody in Toronto. The church was consecrated on May 24, 1911 by the Bulgarian hieromonk Theophylact Malincheff, who issued The First Bulgarian-English Pocket Dictionary in 1913. Their Macedono-Bulgarian Orthodox Churches established by immigrants from Macedonia and Bulgaria, primarily served as community centers for social gatherings and often acted as hubs for the Macedonian Patriotic Organization. The churches represented their shared Bulgarian cultural and religious identity. A Macedono-Bulgarian school, funded in Toronto as early as 1914 was also the first Bulgarian school in the Americas. The first immigrant waves which identified themselves as ethnic Macedonians arrived in the late 1950s and early 1960s from Yugoslavia. The statistics in Canada included for the first time the entries Macedonian language and Ethnic Macedonian in its census questionnaires much later and this led Macedonians to declare themselves as Yugoslavs till the 1980s.

=== History of immigration ===
Many Macedonians emigrated to Canada as "pečalbari" (migrant workers) in the early 20th century. Thousands of Macedonians emigrated to Canada after the failure of the Ilinden Uprising.

The first Macedonian organizations were the Zhelevo Benevolence Brotherhood and the Oschima Benefit Society St. Nicholas, both established in 1907 in Toronto by emigrants from Zhelevo (Antartiko) and Oschnima (Trigonon) in Aegean Macedonia. Other Macedonian organizations were soon established by emigrants from Zagorichani (Vassiliada), Oshtima (Trigonon), Smardesh (Krystallopigi), Gabresh (Gavros), Banitsa (Vevi), Buf (Akritas) and Tarsie (Trivuno), all villages in Aegean Macedonia.

An internal 1910 census counted 1090 Macedonians in Toronto, who were principally from Florina (Lerin) and Kastoria (Kostur) then in Ottoman Empire. By 1940 there were claims that over 1200 Macedonian families were in Canada. Post-World War II and Greek Civil War migration cause the numbers of Macedonians in Canada to swell.

Many early Macedonian immigrants found industrial work in Toronto, either as factory hands or labourers in abattoirs, or in iron and steel foundries. Many ended up running and owning restaurants, butchers and groceries. Macedonian entrepreneurs and their descendants eventually employed their numerical strength within the food service industry as a catapult into a variety of larger and more sophisticated ventures.

Today, most Macedonian Canadians have moved out of cities and into the suburbs, and are employed in the professional, clerical, and service sector of the economy.

The 2001 census recorded 31,265 Macedonians, while the 2006 census recorded 37,705 people of Macedonian ancestry. However, community spokespersons claim they number over 100,000. The Institute for Macedonians Abroad claims that there are 120,000 Macedonians in Canada. The Macedonian government estimates that there are 150,000 Macedonians in Canada.

=== Aegean Macedonians ===
Many thousands of Aegean Macedonians emigrated to Canada in the 1890s. They settled primarily in Ontario, especially Toronto. Many early Aegean Macedonian immigrants found industrial work in Toronto. Later migrants found work as factory in abattoirs and foundries. Chatham and Windsor attracted many Macedonian immigrants who worked along the railroads. Many later settled in Detroit, Michigan.

Many Aegean Macedonians are parishioners of the Macedonian Orthodox Church.

They set up many organizations, such as the Lerin Region Macedonian Cultural Association of Canada. In 1979 The Association of Refugee Children from Aegean Macedonia (ARCAM) was set up in order to unite the former child refugees from all over the world. It was reported that chapters had been set up in Toronto, Melbourne, Perth, the Republic of North Macedonia, Slovakia, Czech Republic and Poland.

== Settlement patterns ==
Prime Minister of Canada Stephen Harper with UMO President Dragi Stojkovski, 2009

Many Macedonians originally settled in industrial areas. Most Macedonians came to Canada via the process of chain migration.

== Organizations ==
Many organizations have been set up by the Macedonians in Canada. Village associations from Banitsa, Osčima, Bouf and Želevo have been set up. A Macedonian Boys' club was founded in Toronto in 1915. Community picnics were also very common amongst Macedonian immigrants. Macedonian basketball and hockey teams were founded. Fundraisers for assistance for the Greek Civil War and the 1963 Skopje earthquake were held. Other establishments, such as the Canadian Macedonian Restaurant Co-op (1970), Canadian Macedonian Business and Professional Association, Canadian Macedonian Historical Society and Macedonian Canadian Medical Society (1992) have been founded in recent years, along with the Macedonian Film Festival (2006). Youth organizations such as Macedonian Association of Canadian Youth, Ryerson Association of Macedonian Students and the Association of Macedonian Students at the University of Toronto are also in operation. Since 1979, Canadian Macedonian Place https://canadianmacedonianplace.com/was established as a senior home for the Macedonian Community.

== Religion ==
Originally Macedonian churches were established under the Bulgarian Diocese of America, Canada and Australia. The church Saint's Cyril and Methodius was consecrated in Toronto in 1910. This was followed by the St. George Macedono-Bulgarian Orthodox Church and the Holy Trinity Macedono-Bulgarian Church. Post-war immigrants built churches under the jurisdiction of the Macedonian Orthodox Church. They were St Clement of Ohrid, St Demetrius of Salonica, St Ilija, St Nedela and St Naum of Ohrid. There are two Macedonian cathedrals in Canada – Toronto being the location of the largest Macedonian church community in Canada: St Clement of Ohrid in Toronto.

== Notable Macedonian Canadians ==
=== Academia ===
- Andrew Rossos – historian
- Boris P. Stoicheff – physicist

=== Art ===
- Gligor Stefanov – Sculptor and Iconographer
- Georgi Danevski – Painter, Iconographer and Muralist

=== Business ===
- John Bitove – chairman and CEO of Obelysk, Mobilicity, Scott's Real Estate Investment Trust, and SiriusXM Canada
- John Bitove, Sr. – businessman and philanthropist
- Susan Niczowski – CEO and founder of Summer Fresh Salads Inc.
- Chris Pavlovski – CEO and founder of Rumble
- Steve Stavro – businessman and philanthropist; founder of Knob Hill Farms, owner of Toronto Maple Leafs, director of Liquor Control Board of Ontario

=== Music ===
- Dan Talevski – singer-songwriter

=== Politics ===
- Paul Christie – Toronto City and Metropolitan Councillor, TTC Chair
- Lui Temelkovski – Liberal MP, Oak Ridges, Markham 2004–2008

=== Sports ===
- Andy Andreoff – NHL player
- Mike Angelidis – NHL player
- Jonah Gadjovich – NHL player
- Tommy Ivan – NHL coach, winner of four Stanley Cups
- Dan Jancevski – NHL defenseman
- Ed Jovanovski – NHL player
- Ethan Page – Professinal wrestler
- Steve Staios – NHL player
- Steven Stamkos – NHL player
- Alek Stojanov – NHL player
- Christopher Tanev – NHL player
- Brandon Tanev – NHL player
- Michael Zigomanis – NHL player

=== Television and entertainment ===
- Ziya Tong – television producer
- Natasha Negovanlis – actress, singer, writer
- Thea Andrews – journalist and TV personality
- Lex Gigeroff – television writer, actor and co-creator of the science fiction series Lexx.

== See also ==
- Canada–North Macedonia relations
- Macedonian diaspora
- Immigration to Canada
- Yugoslav Canadians
- Macedonian Americans
