= Macedonian Orthodox Cathedral of the Dormition of the Virgin Mary =

Macedonian Orthodox Cathedral of the Dormition of the Virgin Mary may refer to:

- Macedonian Orthodox Cathedral of the Dormition of the Virgin Mary, Sydenham, Victoria, Australia
- Macedonian Orthodox Cathedral of the Dormition of the Virgin Mary, Reynoldsburg, Ohio, United States
