= Sts. Cyril & Methody Macedonian Orthodox Church, Blasdell, New York =

Sts. Cyril and Methody
- Sts. Cyril and Methody
- 42.79606°N 78.80314°W
- Location: 4785 Lake Ave. Blasdell, NY; 14219
- Country: United States
- Website: stscyrilandmethodymoc.com

History
- Founded: 1969

Administration
- Diocese: American-Canadian

Clergy
- Priest: Rev. Miki Miovski

Sts. Cyril and Methody is a Macedonian Orthodox church located in Blasdell, New York, just outside of Buffalo.

== Overview ==
The church serves a community of approximately 4,000 Macedonian-Americans within Western New York, as well as portions of Western Pennsylvania (shared by the St. Nicholas Parish in Green, OH). It is the host to the oldest annual Macedonian Orthodox Church festival which has been held every second weekend of July since 1991.

== History ==
The church was founded in the mid- to late-1960s, for the Macedonians seeking refuge from socialist Yugoslavia Many of the church members would work for the local steel industry including a large Bethlehem Steel factory in neighboring Lackawanna. By 1969, land was purchased to begin building a place of worship for the community. Due to a lack of available funding among parishioners, a church hall was constructed instead of a church. The first pastor was Trajko Boseovski.

The church itself followed on May 24, 1975, and was declared by the diocese on July 7. The project was completed on September 13, 1981.

In 2001, Pastor Boseovski was appointed to fill the vacancy at St. Clement of Ohrid Church in Toronto, Ontario, Canada. Pastor Dimitar Alincanec became the new pastor of Sts. Cyril & Methody.

In 2006, Pastor Petko Kesakovski was appointed to the church.

In December 2008, Pastor Andreja Damjanovski was assigned to Sts Cyril & Methoday.

In 2019, pastor Miki Miovski became the fifth priest to preside over the church. The same year, the parish was the host of the annual diocesan meetings and convention.

== Annual Festival ==
The annual ethnic festival began in 1991 and was the first held by any of the Macedonian-Orthodox diocesan churches in New York state (St Dimitrija Rochester and St Gjorgi Syracuse churches followed in later years). It is held on church grounds with live entertainment, including a Macedonian band and dance group, alcohol, baked goods and other foods. The main hallway has become an impromptu museum of Macedonian history. The festival attracts guests from all over North America.
