= Nativity of the Virgin Mary Macedonian Orthodox Cathedral (Sterling Heights, Michigan) =

Church in Michigan, United States

Nativity of the Virgin Mary
- Location within Michigan
- 42.609473318954294°N 83.07235761903068°W
- Location: 43123 Ryan Rd. Sterling Heights, MI; 48314
- Country: United States
- Website: stmarysterlingheights.com

History
- Founded: 1974

Administration
- Diocese: American-Canadian

Clergy
- Priest(s): Archpriest Sinisa Ristovski; Very Reverend Dragan Jordanov

The Macedonian Orthodox Cathedral of the Nativity of the Virgin Mary (Macedonian: Македонска Православна Kатедрала Успение на Пресвета Богородица), also known as "St. Mary" (Macedonian: Пресвета Богородица), is a Macedonian Orthodox Church located in Sterling Heights, Michigan (Detroit area). It is one of the oldest Macedonian Orthodox communities in the United States and in the American-Canadian Diocese.

It is the largest American building in the Macedonian Orthodox Church. It replaced an older church founded in 1974. Construction began in 1998, and services shifted from the prior location in 2000.

== See also ==
- List of churches in the Macedonian Orthodox Diocese of America and Canada
- Macedonian Americans
