= Theophylact of Ohrid =

Byzantine archbishop

Saint Theophylact of Ohrid
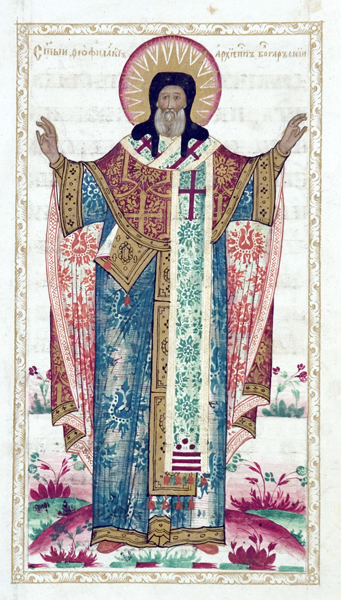
- Icon of Theophylact

Archbishop of Ohrid (Αρχιεπίσκοπος Αχρίδος)
- Born: c. 1050; Chalcis, Euboea, Byzantine Empire (now Greece)
- Died: 1107+
- Venerated in: Eastern Orthodox Church
- Feast: December 31
- Patronage: Ohrid

Theophylact (Greek: Θεοφύλακτος, Bulgarian: Теофилакт; around 1055 – after 1107) was a Byzantine Archbishop of Ohrid and commentator on the Bible. He is regarded as a saint in the Eastern Orthodox Church, commemorated on December 31st.

== Life ==
Theophylact was born in the mid-11th century at Euripus (Chalcis) in Euboea, at the time part of the Byzantine Empire (now Greece). He became a deacon at Constantinople, attained a high reputation as a scholar, and became the tutor of Constantine Doukas, son of the Emperor Michael VII, for whom he wrote The Education of Princes. In about 1078 he moved to the Province of Bulgaria where he became the archbishop of Achrida (modern Ohrid).

Ohrid was one of the capital cities of Bulgaria that had been re-conquered by the Byzantines sixty years earlier. In this demanding position in a conquered territory on the outskirts of the Byzantine Empire, he conscientiously and energetically carried out his pastoral duties over the course of the next twenty years. Although a Byzantine by upbringing and outlook, he was a diligent archpastor of the Bulgarian Church, defending its interests and autonomy (i.e. its independence from the Patriarchate of Constantinople). He acted vigorously to protect his archbishopric from the teachings of the Paulicians and Bogomils (considered heretics by the Eastern Orthodox Church). He won the respect and love of the Bulgarian people who witnessed his labors on their behalf.

In his Letters he complains much about the rude manners of the Bulgarians, and he sought to be relieved of his office, but apparently without success. "His letters from Ohrid are a valuable source for the economic, social, and political history of Bulgaria as well as Byzantine prosopography. They are filled with conventional complaints concerning Theophylact's 'barbarian' surroundings, whereas in fact he was deeply involved in local cultural development, producing an encomium of 15 martyrs of Tiberioupolis and a vita of Clement of Ohrid." He also wrote (in his Letters) accounts of how the constant wars between the Byzantine Empire and the Pechenegs, Magyars and Normans had destroyed most of the food of the land and caused many people to flee to the forests from the towns.

In the 11th century, archbishop Theophylact of Ohrid wrote the following about Pechenegs: "Their advance is like a strike of a lightning, the retreat is both tough and light: It is tough because of the war trophies that they carry, and light since it is so fast. […] They rob other countries since they do not have their own. Peaceful life is a misfortune for them, they are happy when they have a pretext for war. [..] Their number is countless."

His death took place after 1107.

The present day Eastern Orthodox Churches of Serbia, Bulgaria, Greece, and Russia consider him to be a saint, and commemorate him on December 31 as Theophylact of Ohrid (Greek: Θεοφύλακτος Αχρίδος, Bulgarian: Теофилакт Охридски).

== Works ==
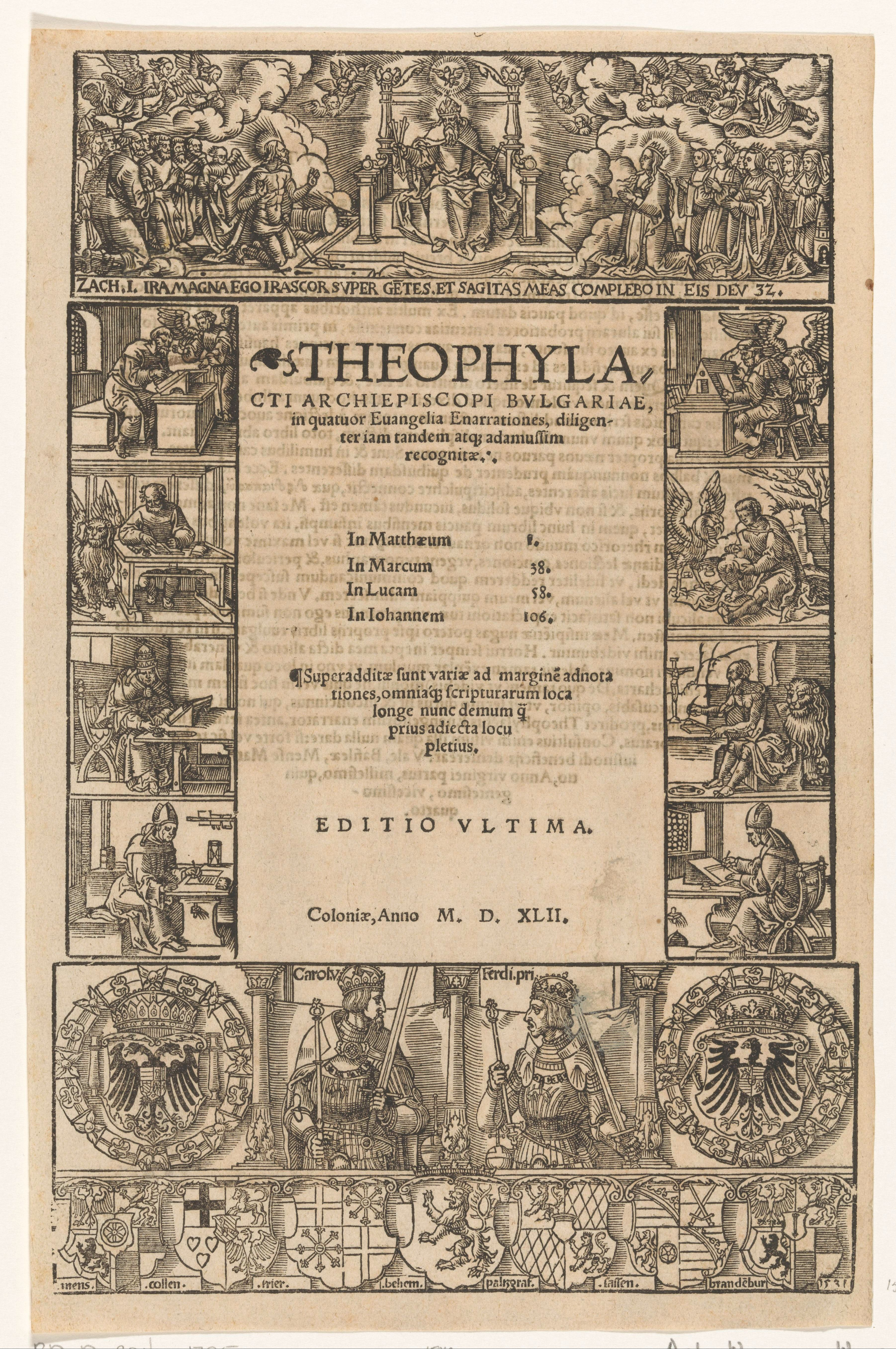
Titlepage of a 16th-century Latin translation of Theophylact's bible commentaries

His commentaries on the Gospels, Acts, the Pauline epistles and the Minor prophets are founded on those of Chrysostom. His other extant works include 130 letters and various homilies and orations, the Life of Clement of Ohrid known as Comprehensive, and other minor pieces. A careful edition of nearly all his writings, in Greek and Latin, with a preliminary dissertation, was published by JFBM de Rossi (4 vols. fol., Venice). The edition was reprinted by Jacques Paul Migne in the Patrologia Graeca vols. 123–6 (1869).

Thomas Aquinas, the celebrated western Christian theologian, included parts of Theophylact's writings in his Catena Aurea, which is a collection of commentary on the four Gospels by the Church Fathers.

In the early 16th century, his Scripture commentaries had an important influence on the Novum Testamentum and Annotationes of Desiderius Erasmus, though Erasmus mistakenly referred to him as "Vulgarius" in early editions of his New Testament. Theophylact's commentaries on the Gospels were published in the original Greek in Rome in 1542, and had been published in Latin by both Catholic (Porsena) and Protestant (Oecolampadius) translators in the 1520s.

Contemporary translations of Theophylact's commentaries are available in modern Greek, Russian, Serbian, Bulgarian, Romanian and English, reflecting the wide influence of his exegetical work within the Orthodox Church, and beyond. A twentieth century Bishop of Ohrid, Nikolaj Velimirović, wrote that Theophylact's "commentaries on the Four Gospels and other books of the New Testament ... are the finest works of their sort after St. John Chrysostom, and are read to this day with great benefit."

== Notes ==
Eastern Orthodox Church titles
Preceded by John III of Ohrid	Archbishop of Ohrid; 1084–1108	Succeeded by Leo II Mung
