= Leo II Mung =

Archbishop of Ohrid

Leo II Mung (Greek: Λέων Μοῡγκος, romanized: Léon Moungos) was the Archbishop of Ohrid in 1108–1120.

Leo was originally a Romaniote Jew, and a pupil of the eminent rabbi Tobiah ben Eliezer, before converting to Orthodox Christianity. A man of great learning—he was nicknamed "the philosopher"—and able to speak several languages, including Slavic ones, he was sent by the Patriarch of Constantinople to missionary activities in what is now the southern Ukraine, before becoming Archbishop of Ohrid. Very little is otherwise known about his life. He became Archbishop of Ohrid in ca. 1108, succeeding Theophylact of Euripus, and held the position until ca. 1120. His successor was Michael Maximos.

Leo commissioned the making of a famous icon of the Virgin.

Eastern Orthodox Church titles
Preceded by Theophylact	Archbishop of Ohrid; 1108–1120	Succeeded by Michael Maximos
