= St. Naum of Ohrid Macedonian Orthodox Church (Hamilton, Ontario) =

Coordinates: 43.1982°N 79.8382°W

St. Naum of Ohrid
- View of St. Naum Macedonian Orthodox Church
- St. Naum of Ohrid
- Location: 1150 Stone Church Road East; Hamilton, Ontario, Canada; L8W 2C7
- Denomination: Macedonian Orthodox Church
- Website: stnaumhamilton.weebly.com

History
- Founded: 1970

Administration
- Diocese: American-Canadian

Clergy
- Pastor: Rev. Angel Stanchev

St. Naum of Ohrid (Macedonian: Свети Наум Охридски) is a Macedonian Orthodox Church located in Hamilton, Ontario, Canada.

== Background ==
In 1970, Macedonians from the Hamilton region raised enough funds for the purchase of a church building on Kensington Ave. In 2003, the parish relocated to a new building at 1150 Stone Church Rd East. Apart from providing religious services, the church committee also manages a banquet hall, as well as Macedonian cultural groups and functions.

== Sources ==
- Katin, Slavé (2018). Maceconians in the World. Skopje: Makedonska Iskra. ISBN 978-608-202-064-8.
