= Susan Niczowski =

Canadian entrepreneur (born 1966)

Susan Niczowski (born 1966) is a Canadian entrepreneur of Macedonian descent as well as founder and president of the company "The Summer Fresh Salads Inc." at Woodbridge, Ontario.

Niczowski was born in North York, Ontario, Canada, now part of Toronto. She is married and has a daughter. Niczowki acquired a degree in chemistry and mathematics from the University of Toronto. She started working as a microbiologist at Shopsy's Foods, a leading meat plant and part of Maple Leaf Foods Inc.

In 1991 Susan Niczowski identified a niche market for freshly prepared foods designed for hungry, time-pressed consumers. Her degree in chemistry and experience working at a leading meat plant allowed her to develop the technology to preserve the freshness and quality of vegetables in delicatessen. Susan and her mother first launched Summer Fresh Salads in a 3,000 square foot facility; today, their products are made in a 63,000 square foot facility and are distributed throughout North America. Her expanding company, named "The Summer Fresh Salads Inc.", is headquartered at Woodbridge, Ontario. Her main customers include major grocery chains, delis and restaurants.

Niczowski is cited a self-made millionaire, her firm Summer Fresh is "an innovative company". Summer Fresh has 220 employees and also sells prepared foods under private label to big grocery chains. It also has a library of more than 3,000 recipes for its products, Niczowski's Summer Fresh Salads business tops $100 million in sales; 2011 it had a revenue of $75–100 million.

The company has been recognized with a number of prestigious awards from the food industry and business community. In 2007, Summer Fresh was named one of Canada's 50 Best Managed Companies. Niczowski was among 100 women honoured in 2003 and 2004 at the Canada's Most Powerful Women Summit organized by the Toronto-based Women's Executive Network. Among the Top 30 Female Entrepreneurs In Canada she ranged 2011 in place 21.

She is member of the board of the "Macedonia 2025 Business and Professionals Association". In an interview Mike Zafirovski, Nortel, named Susan Niczowski as one of the "Big 20" entrepreneurs of the Macedonian diaspora.
