= St. Nicholas Macedonian Orthodox Church (Windsor, Ontario) =

Coordinates: 42.22710°N 82.99858°W

St. Nicholas
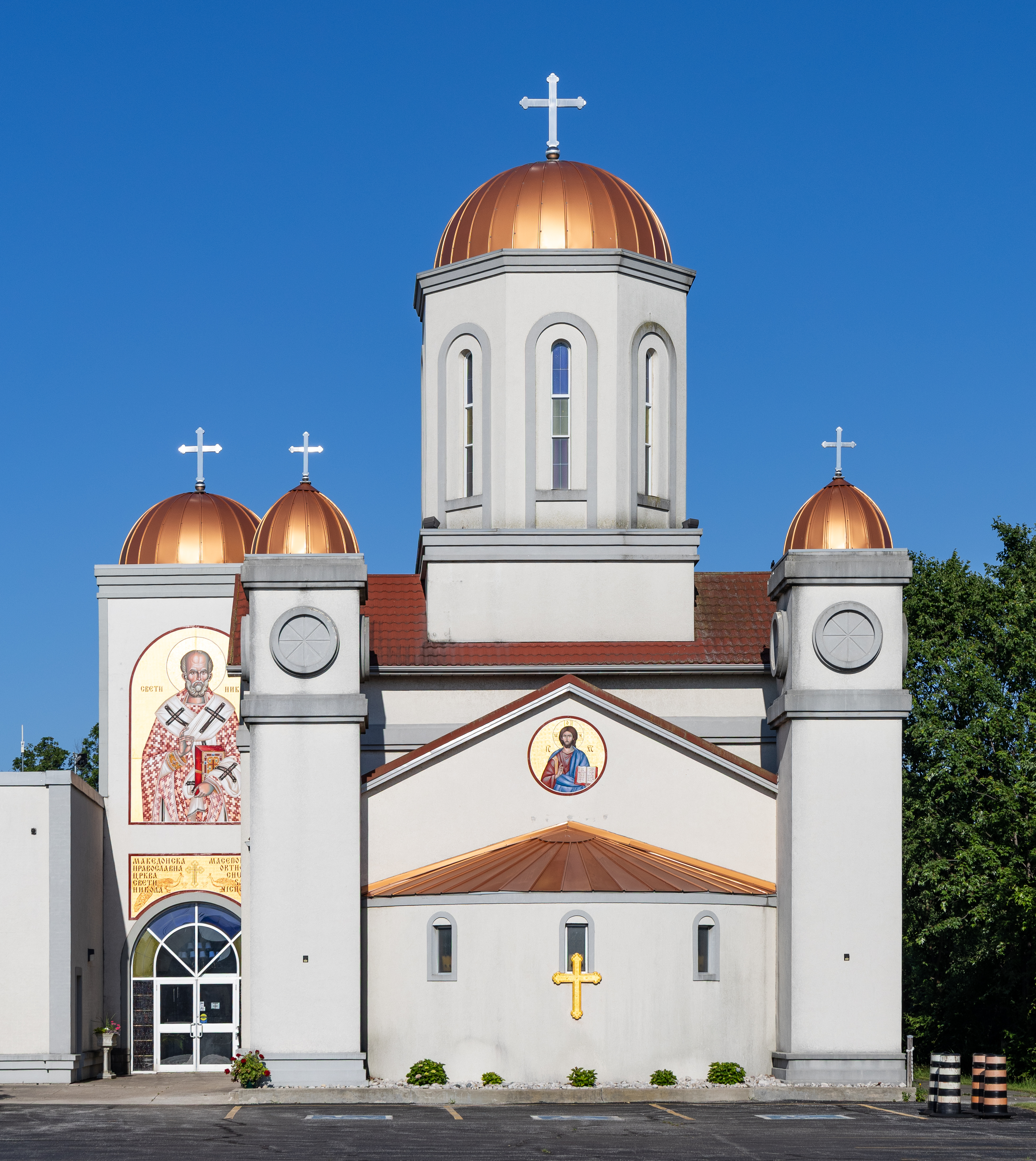
- View of St. Nicholas Macedonian Orthodox Church
- St. Nicholas
- Location: 5225 Howard Avenue; Windsor, Ontario; N9A 6Z6
- Country: Canada
- Denomination: Macedonian Orthodox Church
- Website: macedonianccw.com

History
- Founded: 1971

Administration
- Diocese: American-Canadian

Clergy
- Pastor: Rev. A. Mustenikov

St. Nicholas (Macedonian: Свети Никола) is a Macedonian Orthodox Church located in Windsor, Ontario, Canada.

== Background ==
According to records, the church St. Nicholas of Windsor was established on 5 April 1971. On 12 August 1979, the church was blessed by the Metropolitan of the diocese, Bishop Kiril. The church burnt to the ground in May 1980. Later, in the same place a new and much larger church building was built. In its 40 years of existence, the church went through many changes and additions. It started out as a humble church holding only 50 people, and after it was upgraded to fit 100 people. Finally it was expanded and today it can fit 350 people.

The sanctuary of the church St. Nicholas is a beautiful basilica, decorated with three large domes and bells. The inside of the church is decorated with an iconostasis that was made in North Macedonia. The southern wall is decorated with frescoes that describe the life of Jesus Christ, painted by Macedonian artist and academic Gligor Stefanov. Plans to complete the northern wall of this church are in place and being carried out. On the western wall there is a balcony for the church choir made of a backdrop of decorated wood.

The church owns an area of 16 acres (65,000 m^{2}). On the land exists a Macedonian community center, two modern banquet halls, an up-to-date kitchen, employee rooms, a parking lot with a maximum space of 250 cars, a park with a soccer field, and surrounding forests. In the аssembly of the church exists a woman's auxiliary, a senior's club, a choir group, a radio program, and throughout its history, it has had a Sunday school, religious seminars, a Macedonian folk dance group, soccer group, a children drama club and many different exhibits.
