= John Bitove Sr. =

Canadian businessman

John Bitove Sr. CM
- Born: Lazar Nikola Bitov; 19 March 1928; Toronto, Ontario
- Died: 30 July 2015 (aged 87); Toronto, Ontario
- Occupation: Businessman
- Spouse: Dotsa Bitove
- Children: John Bitove and 4 more
- Awards: Order of Canada

John Louis Nicholas Bitove Sr., CM (born Lazar Nikola Bitov, Macedonian: Лазар Никола Битов; 19 March 1928 – 30 July 2015) was a Macedonian Canadian businessman.

== Biography ==
=== Early life ===
Bitove was born Lazar Nikola Bitov, in Toronto to Macedonian immigrants Nicholas and Vana. His parents immigrated to Canada after World War I in 1919 from Gabresh (today Gavros), a village located in the Kastoria region of Macedonia (Greece).

=== Business career ===
John Bitove Sr. developed, built, and operated various restaurants in Canada. With his wife Dotsa, he created the Java Shoppe in the north part of Toronto (formerly North York), that quickly expanded to 5 restaurants. Bitove brought new restaurant concepts to Toronto such as the Cav-a-bob nightclub, Julie's fine dining and many others. He later acquired the Canadian franchise rights to the Big Boy and Roy Rogers restaurant chains. He used "JB's of Canada" (or "JB's" inside a maple leaf) for the Big Boy Family Restaurants to distinguish it from the American franchise known as JB's. Bitove expanded to a combined 40 Big Boy and Roy Rogers Restaurants. In 1983, a company he created, (York County Quality Foods) was awarded the food and beverage catering contract at the Toronto Pearson International Airport. In 1987 he obtained the catering rights to Toronto's SkyDome (now Rogers Centre) and two years later merged these two companies to form the Bitove Corporation, then one of Canada's largest privately held food service companies.

In 1989 Bitove became a member of the Order of Canada. And in 2013 the Republic of Macedonia awarded him The Order of 8 September, for efforts on behalf of Macedonia, particularly the nation's independence; Macedonia was the homeland of his and his wife's parents.

Bitove was a director of several companies, including Oppenheimer & Co. He also organized, founded and was involved in, many charitable activities, most notably, with Dotsa, the founding of Canadian Macedonian Place, a home for the aged people of Macedonian descent as well as ProAction/Cops&Kids, a partnership with the Metropolitan Toronto Police to fund programs targeting high-risk youth in Toronto.

Various social, educational and medical causes bear the family's name, including the John and Dotsa Bitove Family Law Library at the University of Western Ontario Law School.

=== Political activity ===
In the early 1990s, John Bitove founded an International Macedonian Lobby to assist the newly proclaimed Republic of Macedonia on its efforts for international recognition. As a result, former advisors of two United States presidents and one Canadian prime minister were hired to lobby foreign governments, as well as the European Community and the United Nations, to recognise the Republic of Macedonia as a sovereign and independent state. At the same time, Bitove formed the first World Macedonian Congress (see World Macedonian Congress for the rival organisation), an organisation modelled after the Jewish World Congress, to promote the interests of the Republic of Macedonia and the ethnic Macedonians throughout the world. John Bitove provided significant financial resources to the United Macedonian Diaspora. He also supported and promoted the United Macedonia, a concept among Macedonian nationalists that aims to unify the transnational region of Macedonia into a single state with the Greek city of Thessaloniki as its capital.

== Personal life ==
He was married to Dotsa and had five children – Vonna, Tom, Nick, John and Jordan. He died in Toronto in July 2015.
