= Constantine Kabasilas =

13th-century Byzantine cleric

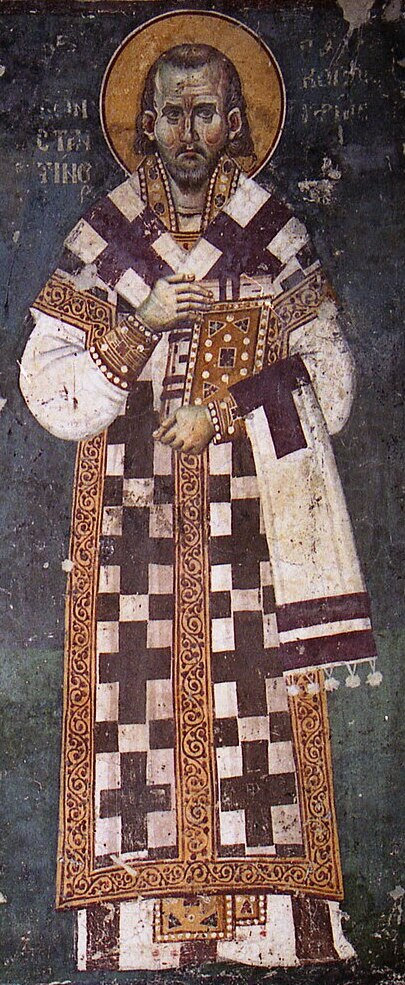
Fresco of Kabasilas in the Church of St. Mary Peribleptos, Ohrid

Constantine Kabasilas (Ancient Greek: Κωνσταντῖνος Καβάσιλας, fl. 1235–1259) was a prominent Byzantine cleric in the mid-13th century. Before 1235 he had served as archbishop of Strumitza and then as metropolitan bishop of Dyrrhachium, and sometime before the mid-1250s he was appointed to the prestigious post of Archbishop of Ohrid.

Constantine was born to the Kabasilai, a noble family which traces its origin to the early 11th century noble Constantine Kabasilas, a foreigner and servant of Basil II who was later appointed as strategos by Empress Theodora in 1042 and possibly doux of the West. While a coherent genealogy is difficult to devise, the cleric Constantine was the brother of John Kabasilas, a minister at the court of the Despot of Epirus, Michael II Komnenos Doukas, and of Theodore Kabasilas, another of Michael II's supporters. Due to his brothers' close ties to the Epirote ruler, his loyalty was suspected by the Nicaean emperor Theodore II Laskaris, and he was put in prison until 1259, when Michael VIII Palaiologos set him free and allowed him to return to his see.

== Sources ==
- Kazhdan, Alexander (1991). "Kabasilas". In Kazhdan, Alexander (ed.). The Oxford Dictionary of Byzantium. Oxford and New York: Oxford University Press. p. 1087. ISBN 0-19-504652-8.
- Trapp, Erich; Walther, Rainer; Beyer, Hans-Veit; Sturm-Schnabl, Katja (1981). "Καβάσιλας Κωνσταντῖνος". Prosopographisches Lexikon der Palaiologenzeit (in German). Vol. 5. Vienna: Verlag der Österreichischen Akademie der Wissenschaften. ISBN 3-7001-3003-1.
