= KEYreit =

- Type: Public
- Traded as: TSX: KRE.UN
- Industry: Real Estate Investment Trusts
- Headquarters: Toronto, Ontario, Canada
- Key people: John Bitove
- Website: www.keyreit.com

KEYreit (formerly Scott's Real Estate Investment Trust) was a publicly traded real estate investment trust in Canada that owns over 200 retail properties comprising more than 1,025,000 square feet (95,200 m^{2}) in 9 provinces across the country.

The REIT primarily focuses on the acquisition of small box retail (banks, financial institutions, pharmacies, restaurants and other retail establishments) properties in attractive Canadian markets.

It was bought by PlazaCorp in June 2013.
