= Stefan of Ohrid and Macedonia =

Fifth Archbishop of Ohrid and Macedonia

His Beatitude Stephen
- Metropolitan of Skopje and Archbishop of Ohrid and Macedonia
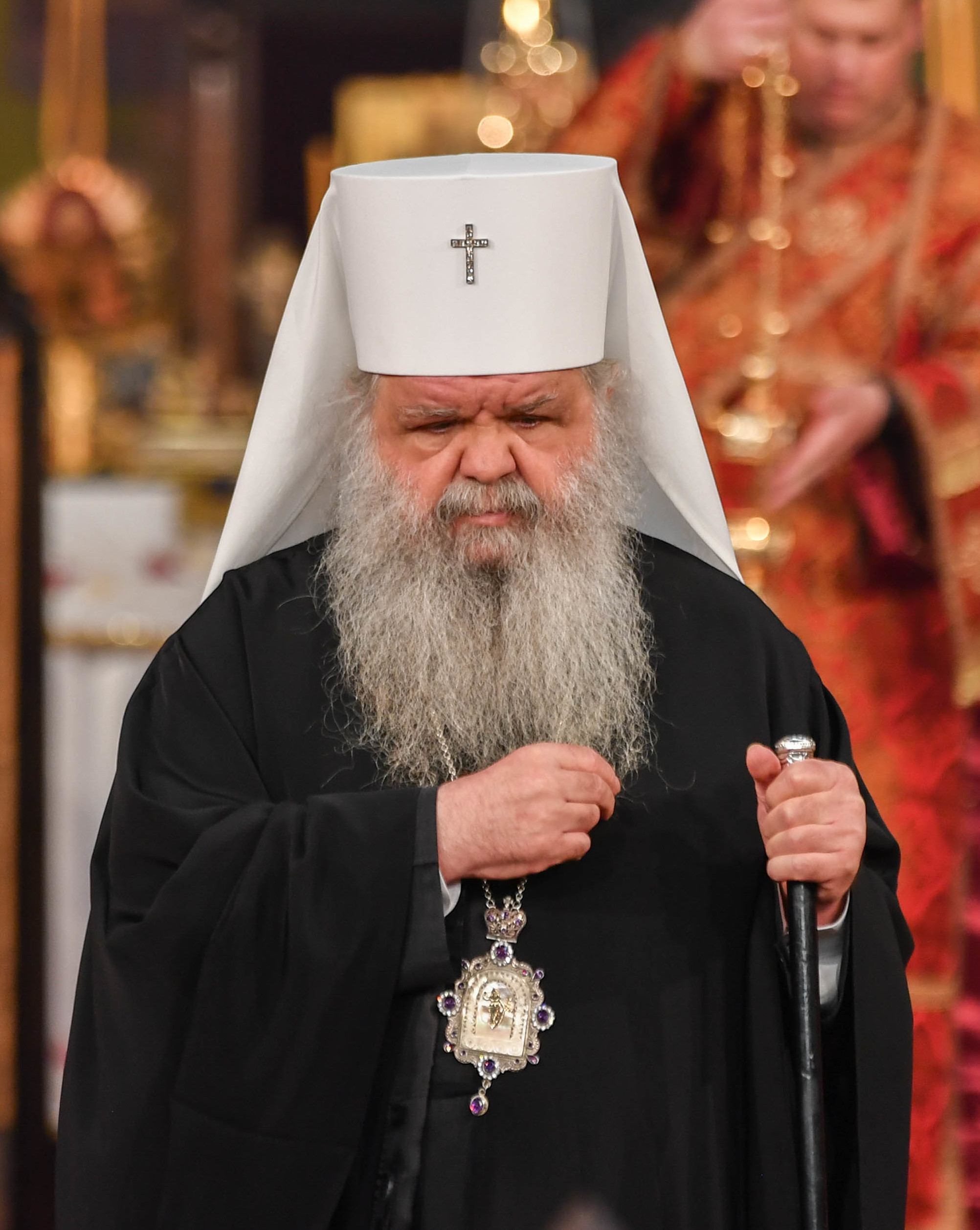
- Archbishop Stefan in 2022
- Church: Macedonian Orthodox Church
- See: Skopje
- Installed: 9/10 October 1999
- Predecessor: Michael
- Previous posts: Metropolitan of Zletovo and Strumica, later of Bregalnica (1986-1999)

Orders
- Consecration: 12 July 1986

Personal details
- Born: Stojan Veljanovski; 1 May 1955 (age 71) Dobruševo, PR Macedonia, FPR Yugoslavia
- Denomination: Eastern Orthodox Church

Styles of Stephen of Ohrid and Macedonia Стефан Охридски и Македонски
- Spoken style: Неговото блаженство, господин господин His Beatitude

Stefan of Ohrid and Macedonia (Macedonian: Архиепископ Охридски и Македонски г.г. Стефан/Arhiepiskop Ohridski i Makedonski g.g. Stefan; born 1 May 1955) is the fifth Archbishop of Ohrid and Macedonia, metropolitan of Skopje, primate and spiritual leader of the Macedonian Orthodox Church.

== Life ==
Archbishop Stefan, whose secular name is Stojan Veljanovski (Стојан Вељановски), was born on 1 May 1955, in the village of Dobruševo, in FPR Yugoslavia, today in North Macedonia. In 1969, he enrolled in the Macedonian Orthodox Theological Seminary of St. Clement of Ohrid in Dračevo, where he graduated in 1974. The same year he went on to study at the University of Belgrade Theological Faculty, graduating in 1979. After graduation, the Holy Synod of the Macedonian Orthodox Church named him a teacher at the Theological Seminary in Skopje. In 1980, he left for postgraduate studies at the Institute of St. Nicholas in Bari, Italy, specializing in ecumenical and Byzantine studies. After returning from Italy, he became a professor at Skopje's St. Clement of Ohrid Theological Faculty, teaching the subjects Holy Scripture of the Old Testament and Patrology. He took his monastic vows at the Saint Naum monastery in Ohrid on 3 July 1986, and on 12 July he was named Metropolitan of Zletovo and Strumica. Afterwards, he was enthroned as Bishop of Bregalnica.

In the following years, he worked as a professor of the Orthodox Religious Faculty in Skopje, served as dean of the Theological Faculty in Skopje, was a spokesman for the Holy Synod of the Macedonian Orthodox Church, and was the editor-in-chief of the church's official gazette "Church Life" (Црковен живот). In Ohrid on 9 and 10 October 1999, the Church National Assembly ― a congregation of clerics and laymen ― elected him as the fifth archbishop (head) of the Macedonian Orthodox Church. In 2002, he gave medallions of Christ to the paramilitaries from the unit Lions, which was criticized by human rights activists, Albanian political leaders and opposition political parties. On 16 May 2022, he became the first Archbishop of Ohrid to be canonically recognized since Dositej II, owing to the resolution by the Holy Synod of the Serbian Orthodox Church to accept the canonical status of the Macedonian Orthodox Church.

== Views ==
During the 2001 insurgency in Macedonia, he called for a holy war against the Albanian "terrorists who are stealing our territory." For him, gay marriage "is not only a violation of the holy will of God but ... an introduction and a prerequisite for the dissolution of the family as the basic cell of every civilization and society." When he was in Vatican in 2008 at the grave of the Saint Cyril, he said that his work has been almost negated in his hometown Thessaloniki, for which he was criticized by Greek officials and clergy. In 2010, along with the heads of other religious communities, he proposed changing the Macedonian constitution to define marriage strictly as a union between a man and a woman and to prevent same-sex couples and single parents from adopting children.

In 2011, the Bulgarian Cultural Club in Skopje stated that he said that Spaska Mitrova, a Macedonian with a Bulgarian passport, belongs to the "dregs of society, traitors and freaks." It requested an apology from him and threatened to ask the Bulgarian Orthodox Church to restore its historic diocese in Macedonia if he failed. In 2022, he stated that Greek churches will not be forced to call the Macedonian Orthodox Church by its name and that the term "Macedonian" would not be omitted from the name. Along with other religious leaders in North Macedonia, in 2023, he demanded the withdrawal of bills on birth registration and gender equality, arguing that they contradict the teachings of all religious communities. In May 2024 he rejected Constantinople's patriarchal conditions for the church's independence, claiming he will not give up the name 'Macedonian'. The Macedonian Church aligned with Moscow against the Orthodox Church of Ukraine and in September 2024 Archbishop Stefan expressed support for the banned Ukrainian Orthodox Church under the Moscow Patriarchate.

Preceded by Michael	Archbishop of Ohrid and Macedonia; 1999–	Succeeded by incumbent
