= John Bitove =

Canadian businessman and sportsman

- Born: John I. Bitove Jr. September 1960 (age 66); Toronto, Ontario, Canada
- Education: Indiana University Bloomington; University of Windsor
- Occupations: Businessman & Investor
- Known for: Founder of Toronto Raptors
- Spouse: Randi Zenner
- Children: 3
- Parents: John Bitove Sr.; Dotsa Bitove
- Website: obelysk.com

John I. Bitove Jr. (born 1960 in Toronto, Ontario) is a Canadian businessman and sportsman. He a co-founder of the Toronto Raptors of the NBA. Through his holding company, Obelysk, he is involved in several entities including; SiriusXM Canada, Canada's largest subscriber radio service and Dave's Hot Chicken Canada. He is the founder of Mobilicity, a mobile wireless service, which was sold to Rogers Communications in July, 2015. He was also the major shareholder of KEYreit, Canada's largest "small box" real estate investment trust that was sold in 2013.

On September 30, 1993 the National Basketball Association awarded a group led by Bitove to be the 29th team to join the league. In addition to being a Co-Founder of the Toronto Raptors basketball team, he led the creation of what is now the Scotiabank Arena formerly the Air Canada Centre, the major home of sports and entertainment in Toronto, including some new, state-of-art stadium features.

In 2005, he established the S'Cool Life Fund, which has raised over $2.8 million to fund extracurricular activities in Canadian public schools. To date S'Cool Life Fund has provided grants to over 1,000 schools for D.R.E.A.M.S. (Drama, Recreation, Extra-Curricular, Arts, Music, or Sports) projects across Canada helping to make school life more enjoyable for thousands of public elementary children in grades K-8.

Bitove was the volunteer president of the Toronto bid for the 2008 Summer Olympics.

He has also been the volunteer organizer for the 1993 IAAF World Indoor Championships in Athletics (track and field) and the 1994 FIBA World Championship of Basketball. In 2005, he received the first James Naismith Award of Excellence by Canada Basketball.

Bitove earned an undergraduate Bachelor of Science degree in Business (marketing) from Indiana University Bloomington in 1983. He is a member of the Beta Eta chapter of Sigma Nu fraternity. He also received a Bachelor of Laws degree from the University of Windsor in 1984 and was called to the bar and admitted to the Law Society of Upper Canada (Ontario) in 1986. Since 2007 he has served on the board of trustees of Wake Forest University in North Carolina. He is the son of John Bitove Sr. and is of Macedonian heritage. He is married to Randi Zenner and has three children.

Sporting positions
First	Toronto Raptors owner 1995–1996	Succeeded by Allan Slaight
Preceded by club did not exist	Toronto Raptors CEO; 1993–1997	Succeeded by Richard Peddie (CEO)
