= Macedonian Orthodox Cathedral of the Dormition of the Virgin Mary, Sydenham =

Macedonian Orthodox Cathedral of the Dormition of the Virgin Mary
- Македонска Православна Катедрална Црква „Успение на Пресвета Богородица“ Makedonska Pravoslavna Katedralna Crkva "Uspenie na Presveta Bogorodica"
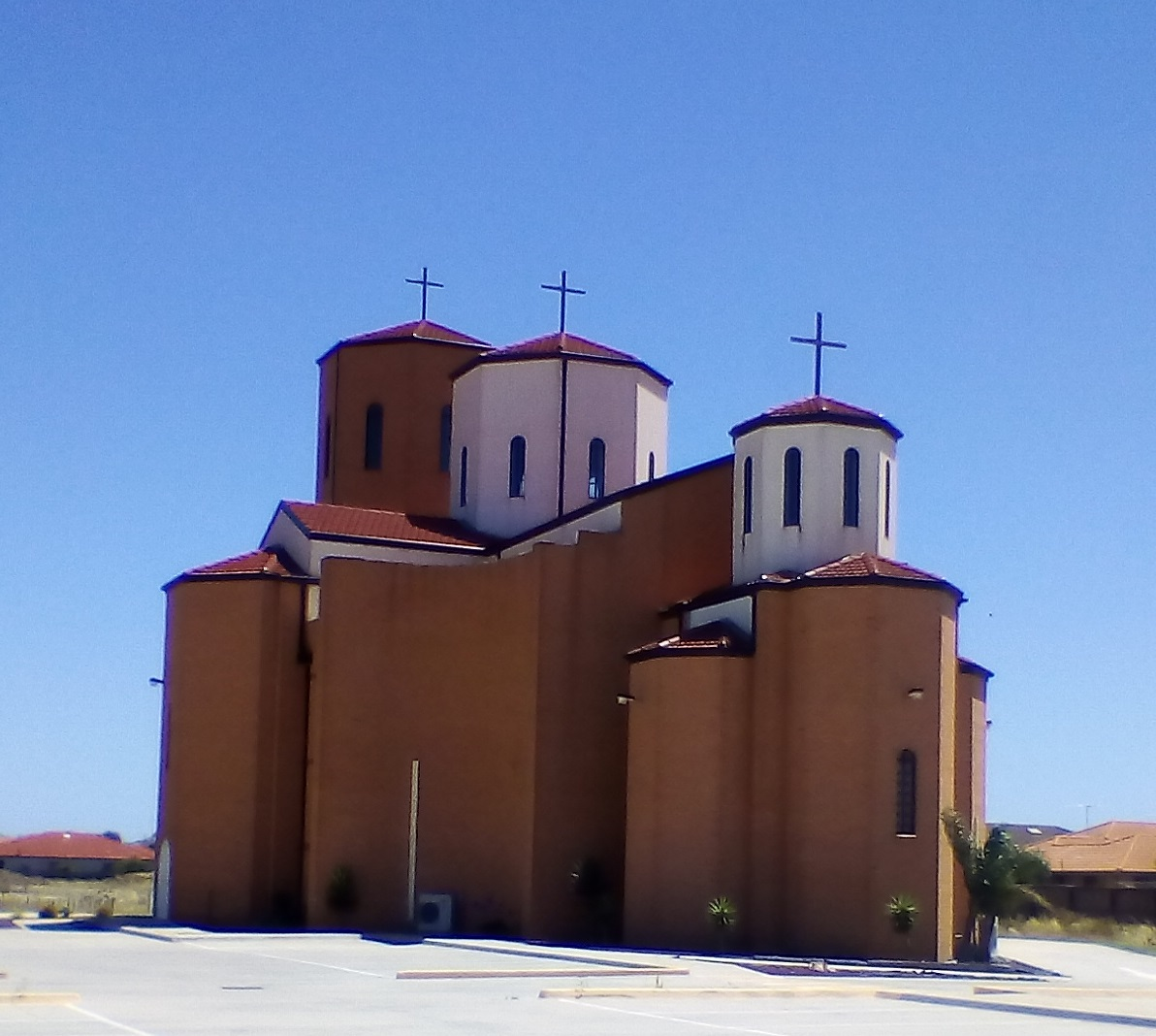

- Location in greater metropolitan Melbourne
- 37°42′16″S 144°46′32″E
- Location: 340 Sydenham Rd, Sydenham 3037, Melbourne, Victoria
- Country: Australia
- Denomination: Macedonian Orthodox
- Website: St. Mary's Holy Mother of God Church

History
- Status: Church
- Dedication: St. Mary (Dormition of the Mother of God)
- Consecrated: 1996

Architecture
- Functional status: Active
- Architectural type: Church

Administration
- Diocese: Macedonian Orthodox Diocese of Australia - Sydney

Clergy
- Priest: Reverend Father Eftim Betinski

The Macedonian Orthodox Cathedral of the Dormition of the Virgin Mary (Macedonian: Македонска Православна Катедрална Црква „Успение на Пресвета Богородица“, Makedonska Pravoslavna Katedralna Crkva "Uspenie na Presveta Bogorodica) is a Macedonian Orthodox cathedral church located in Sydenham, a suburb of northwestern Melbourne, Victoria, Australia.

== History ==
In 1994 the local Macedonian community began efforts to establish a church in the western suburbs of Melbourne. The initiative was approved by the Macedonian Holy Synod in February 1995.

The church was built on Sydenham Road in Sydenham. Metropolitan Petar consecrated the church in October 1996.

In April 2016, the church hall and shed were burned down in a fire considered suspicious by local authorities.

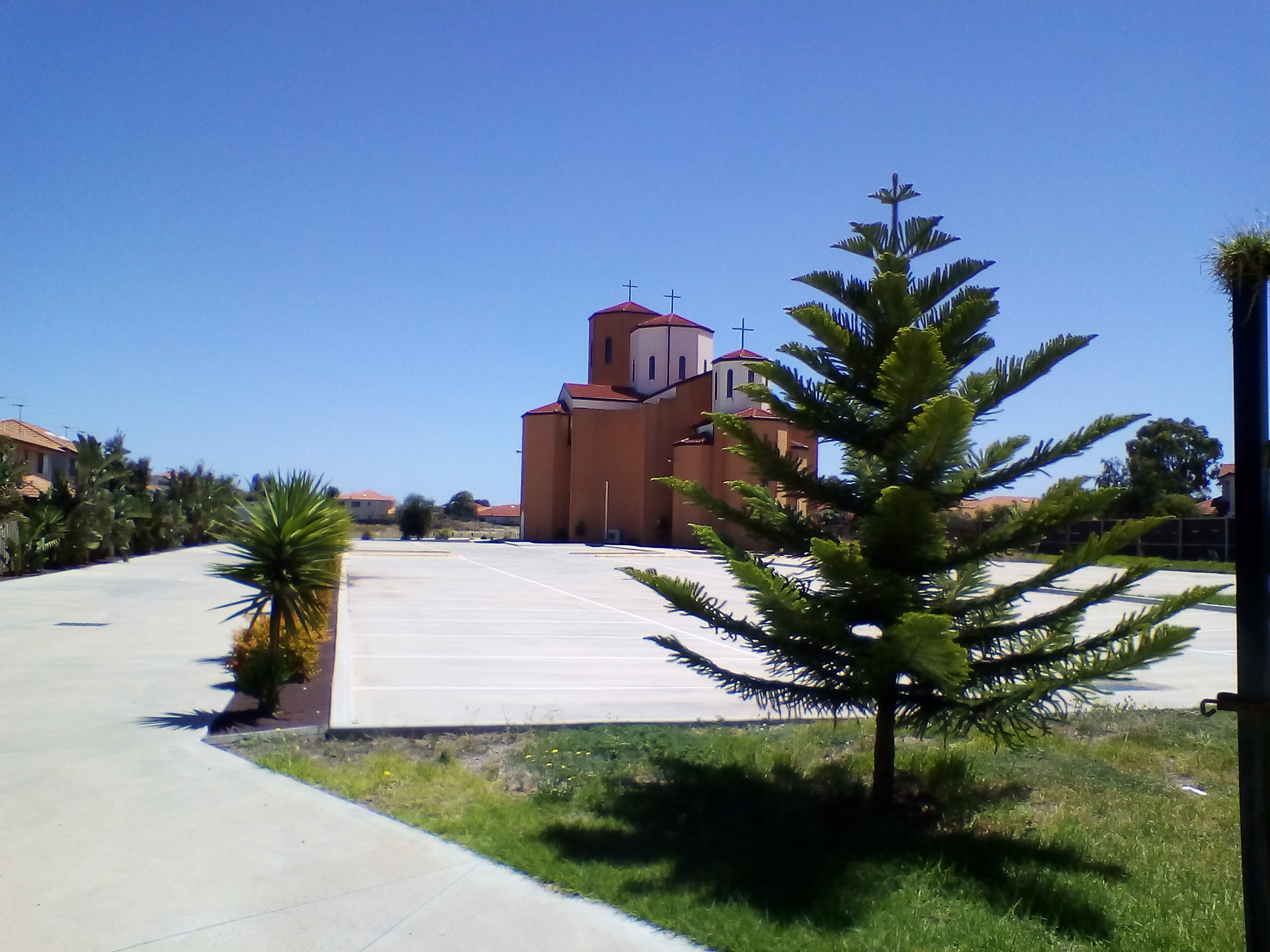
Church carpark

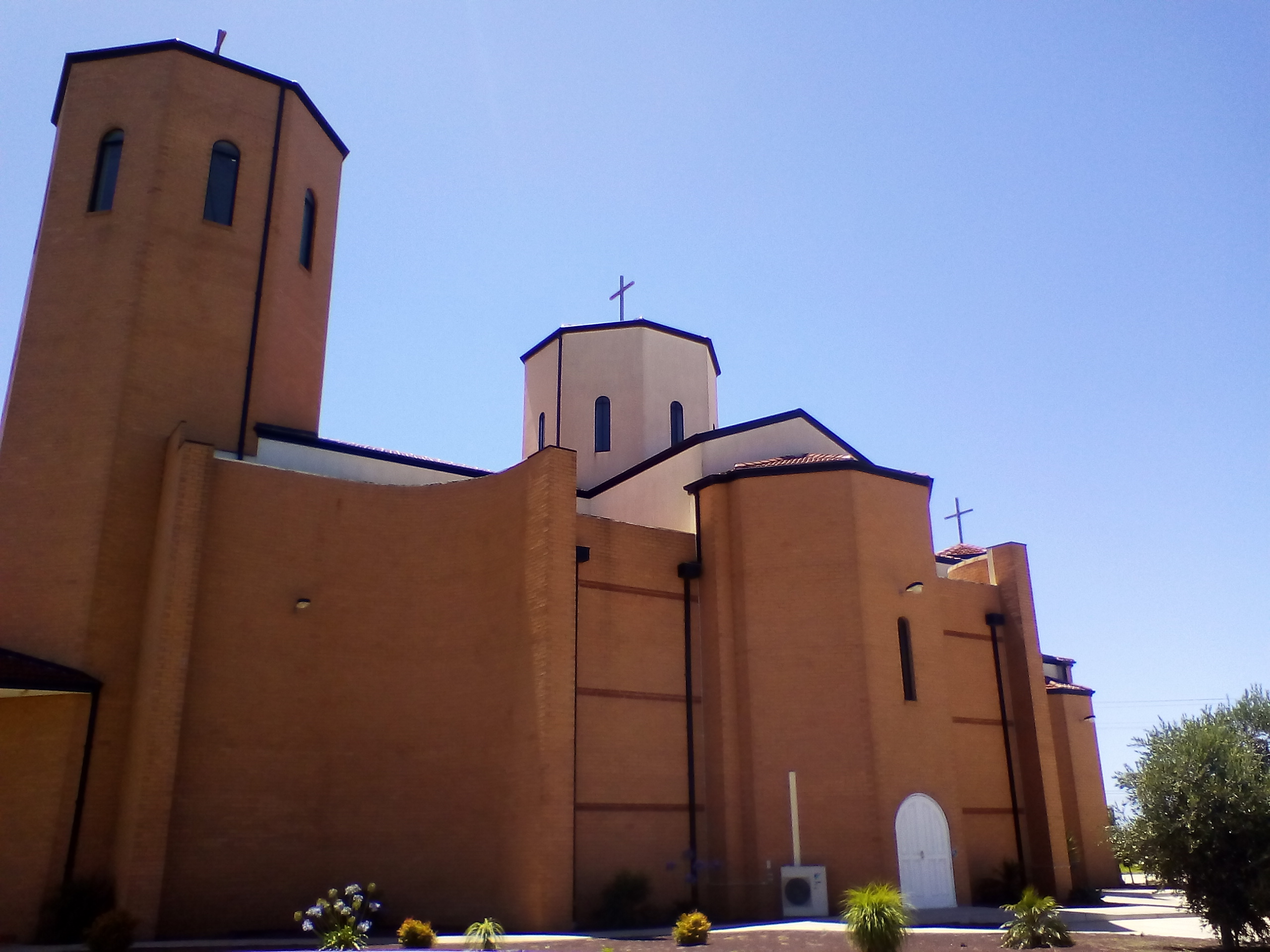
Church (left side)

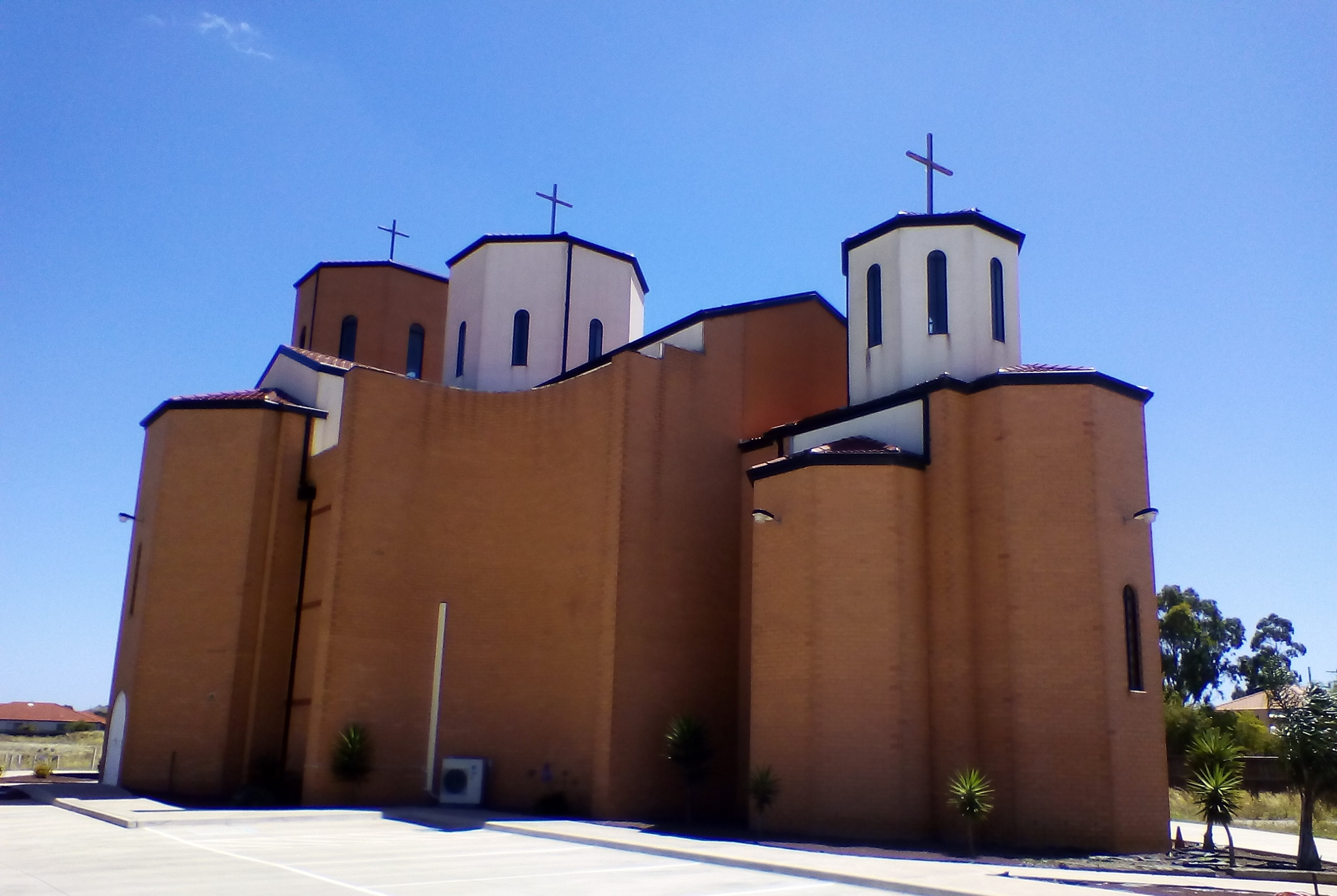
View of Church

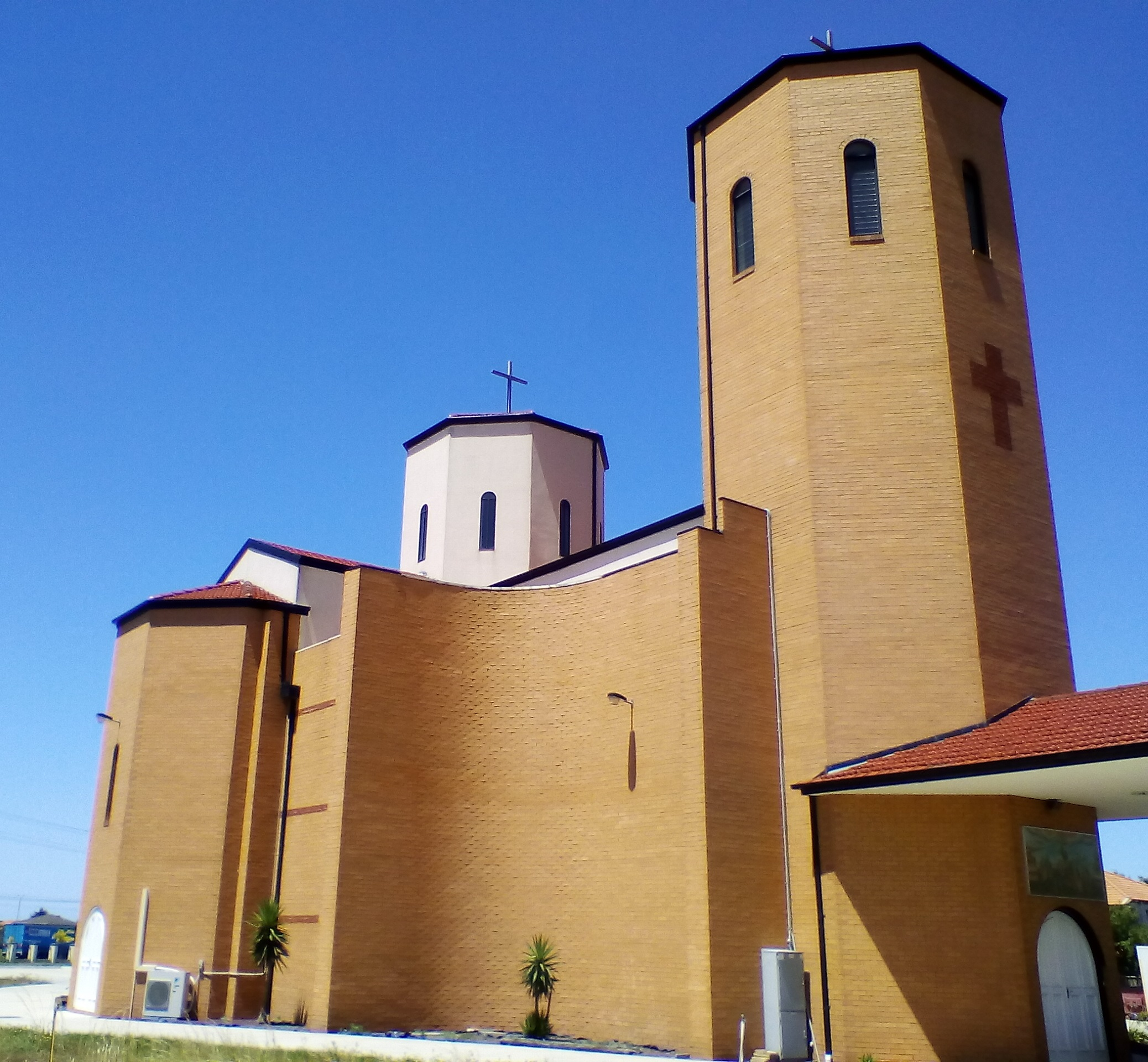
Church (right side)

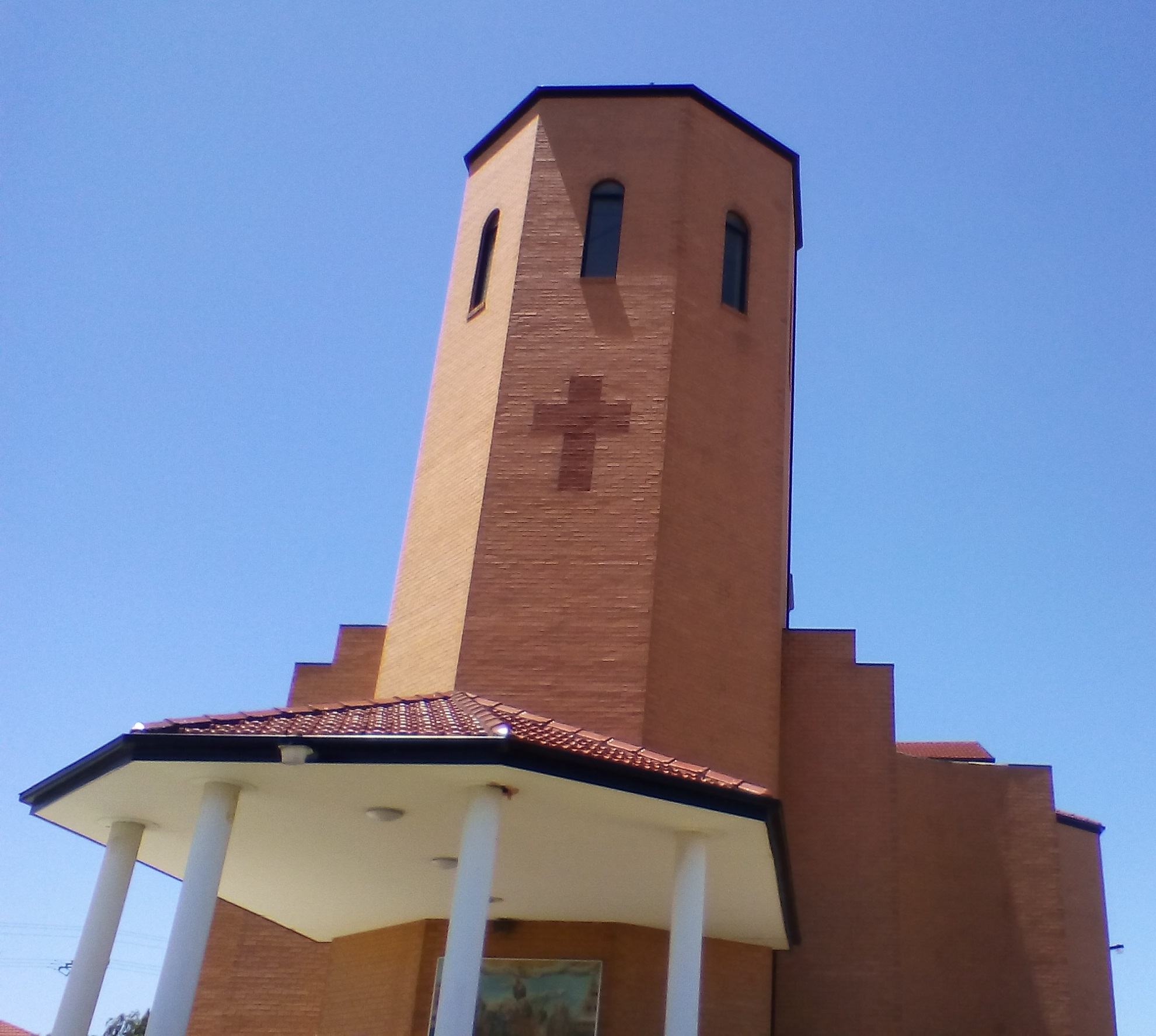
Cross above main entrance

== See also ==
- Macedonian Australians
