= Georgi Danevski =

Canadian Macedonian painter, iconographer and muralist

- Born: Georgi Danevski; 25 July 1947
- Known for: Murals, Canvas
- Notable work: St. Dimitrija Solunski Macedonian Orthodox Church, Markham, Ontario
- Website: georgidanevski.com

Georgi Danevski (born 25 July 1947) is a Canadian Macedonian painter, iconographer and muralist. He was born in Yugoslav Macedonia, before spending a number of years traveling and becoming known throughout Europe and North America for his murals and canvas art. He designed and painted a large mural at St. Dimitrija Solunski Macedonian Orthodox Church, Markham, Ontario and other churches. He was also commissioned to paint a portrait of Frank Stronach, the founder of Magna International, Moses Znaimer and also a painting of the Canadian Triple Crown racehorse Wando.

== Early life ==
Danveski was born in Saramzalino, then in SFR Yugoslavia on 25 July 1947. He grew up in SR Macedonia, where he was adopted at the age of 4 by his uncle. His adopted father played an early role in shaping Danevski into a young artist. He regularly attended a Macedonian Orthodox Church in Berovo with his grandmother, where he became fascinated by its décor. The church, situated in an archaeological town, features some of the earliest Byzantine icons and frescoes that date back centuries. He pursued his passion for art throughout his education. He married at a young age and settled in Vinica. He specialized in art in High School in Skopje, SR Macedonia and later completed his education in 1972 after graduating with a master's degree from the University of Ljubljana where he was mentored by Gabriel Stupica and Zoran Didek. Following his graduation, he spent a number of years travelling between various countries and cities, including Spain, Germany, Austria, France, Switzerland, Russia and Italy, before emigrating to Toronto, Canada in 1995.

== Works ==
Danevski is best known for his muralist works in Churches. His life as an artist changed dramatically when he was approached by two Canadian Macedonians to move to Toronto. The reason behind the move was to carry out a large project, where he would adorn the first North American Macedonian Church, St. Clement of Ohrid Macedonian Orthodox Cathedral in Toronto, which features his fresco mural. Danevski was featured in the Toronto Star in 2007 after he began painting unique Byzantine-style frescos and iconography throughout the St. Dimitrija Solunski Macedonian Orthodox Church, Markham, Ontario in Canada. The mural is 600 square meters in size and was completed in 2010. The completed mural contains over 1000 icons and composite murals depicting Christian history.

== Work on Canvas ==
Danevski's work is best known throughout Europe, where he made his mark initially. He has created a number of expressions, which led to him having a broad and steady demand from private collectors, museums and galleries. Much of the demand for his work comes from North America and also Europe. His work has been exhibited at a number of exhibitions, including the "Chamber Exhibition", Parliament of Canada, Ottawa. It was recently quoted that he sold the painting 'Three' for the value of $27,000 € in London, England in 2007. Original horse paintings created by Danevski are collected by many private collectors, including the famous jockey, Desmond Sanford "Sandy" Hawley. Danveski was commissioned in 2003 by The Ontario Jockey Club to paint a portrait of the champion horse, Wando. The horse won the Canadian Triple Crown in 2003. During the same year, he was commissioned to paint a portrait of Frank Stronach, the founder of Magna International and also a portrait of Moses Znaimer, founder of Citytv Toronto and ZoomerMedia.

== Influence ==
In the book Heavenly Iconostasis of Danevski, Danevski stated that he is influenced by Nature, El Greco, Francisco Goya, Diego Velázquez and Rembrandt.

== Films ==
A number of films have been created about Danevski's life and work. In 2010, Omni TV produced a documentary filmed on location in Europe and Toronto, Canada about Danevski's life, Confessions of the Heart, which covered much of his life and his artistic work. The film Icons of God’s Eyes, also featured Danevski, which was produced by the San Paolo Film Company and The Vatican.
