= Macedonian Orthodox Cathedral of the Dormition of the Virgin Mary, Reynoldsburg =

Dormition of the Virgin Mary
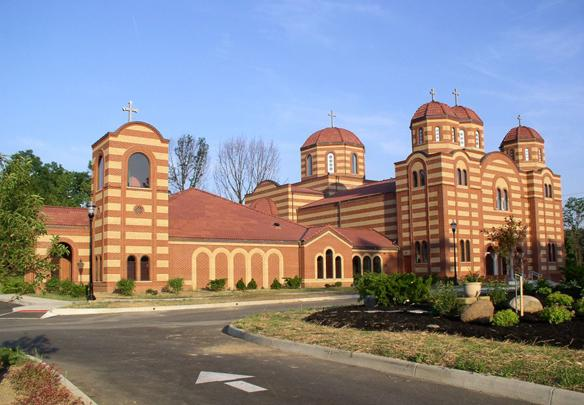
- The new church building of St. Mary Macedonian Orthodox Cathedral

- Location within Ohio
- 39.9777°N 82.7941°W
- Location: 400 S. Waggoner Rd. Reynoldsburg, Ohio; 43068
- Country: United States
- Website: saintmaryohio.org

History
- Founded: 1958

Administration
- Diocese: American-Canadian

Clergy
- Priest(s): Very Rev. Dusko Gorgievski (Dean); Rev. Radovan Cekovski

The "Macedonian Orthodox Cathedral of the Dormition of the Virgin Mary" (Macedonian: Македонска Православна Kатедрала Успение на Пресвета Богородица), also known as "St. Mary" (Macedonian: Пресвета Богородица), is a Macedonian Orthodox Church located in Reynoldsburg, Ohio (Columbus area). It is one of the oldest Macedonian Orthodox communities in the United States and in the American-Canadian Diocese.

== Church name ==
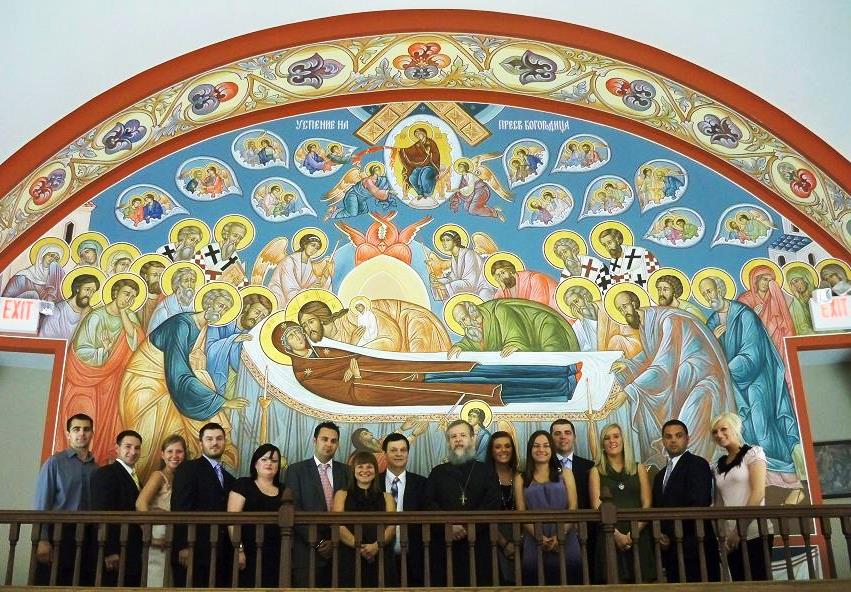
"Dormition of the Most Holy Birthgiver of God," a 2010 fresco in the cathedral

The parish was consecrated as "Makedonska Pravoslavna Crkva Uspenie na Presveta Bogorodica" (Macedonian Cyrillic: Македонска Православна Црква „Успение на Пресвета Богородица“), in honor of the Great Feast of the Dormition of the Mother of God in the Eastern Orthodox Church.

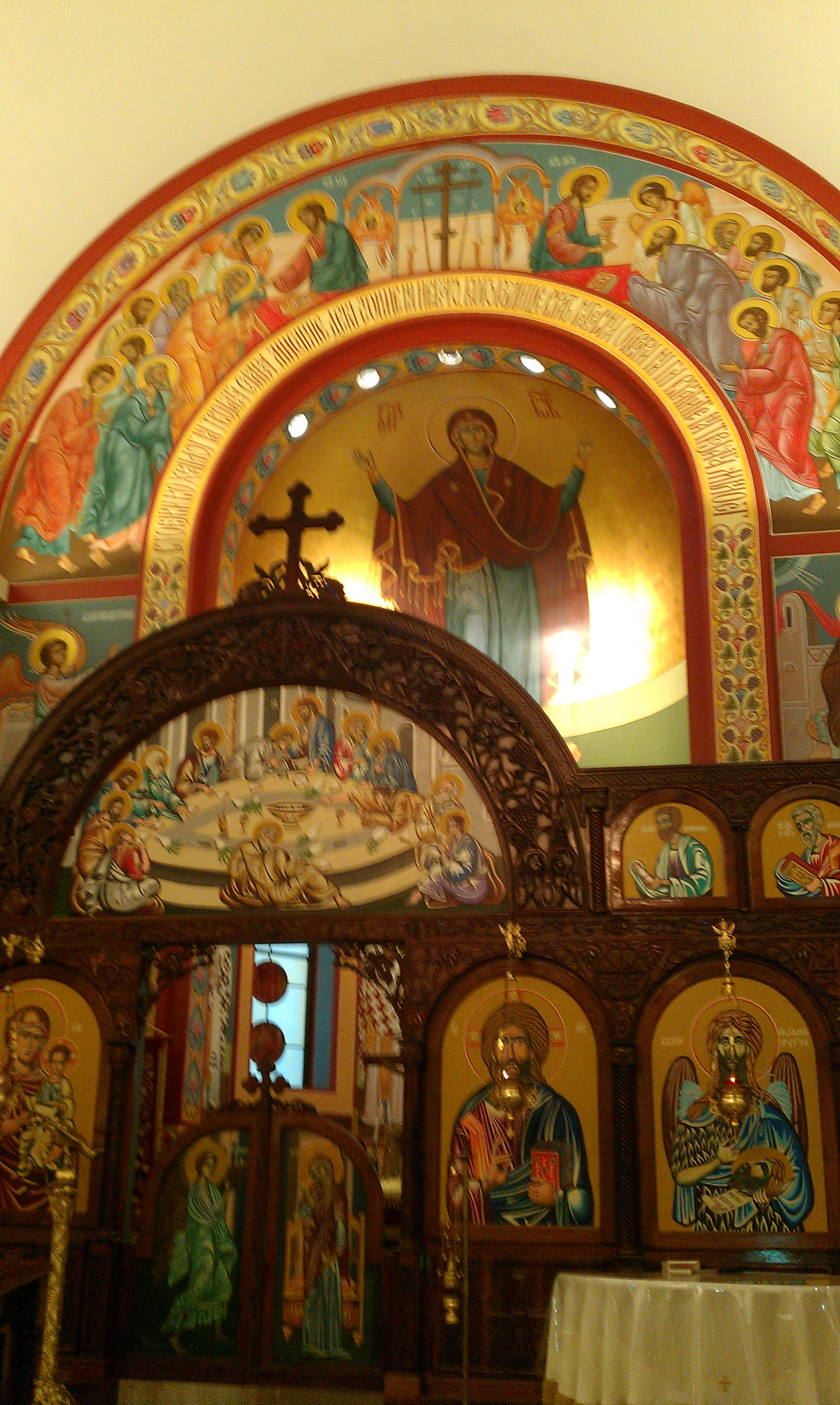
A fresco in the church, 2011

The parish belongs to the Vicariate of the Mid West of the American-Canadian Macedonian Orthodox Diocese of the Macedonian Orthodox Church - Ohrid Archbishopric.

== Iconography and frescopainting ==
In 2008 the parish began work on frescos on the interior sanctuary walls.

== See also ==
- Macedonian Americans

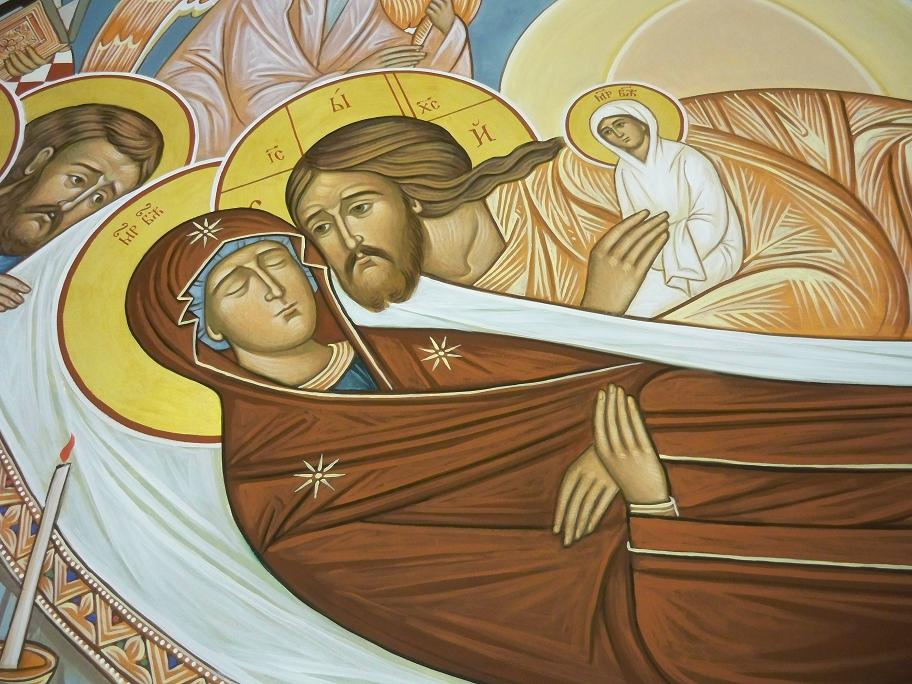
Dormition fresco-detail

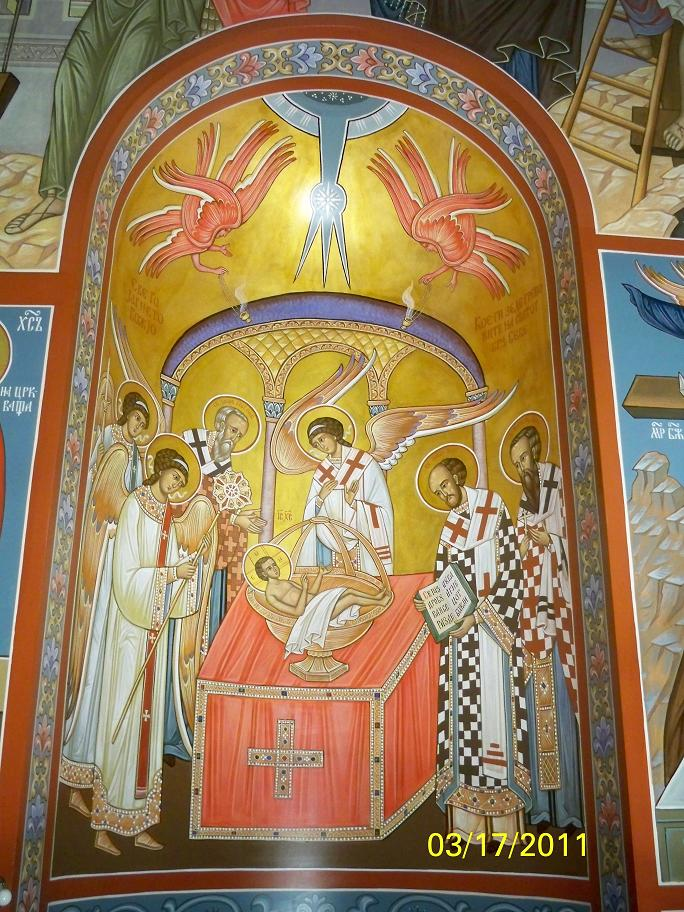
Proskomede

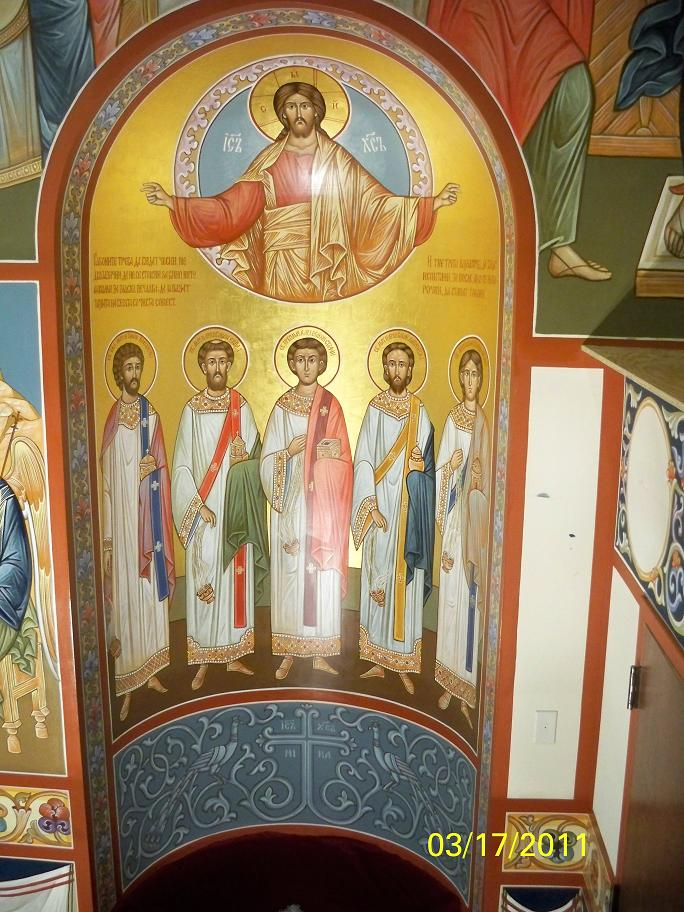
Deaconicon
