= Michael Gogov =

Fourth Archbishop of Ohrid and Macedonia

His Beatitude Mihail
- Archbishop of Ohrid and Macedonia
- Church: Macedonian
- See: Skopje
- Installed: 4 December 1993
- Term ended: 6 July 1999
- Predecessor: Gabriel II
- Successor: Stefan

Orders
- Consecration: 1988

Personal details
- Born: 1912 Novo Selo, Ottoman Empire (now North Macedonia)
- Died: 6 July 1999 (aged 86–87) Skopje, Macedonia
- Buried: Church "St. Naum of Ohrid", Radišani, North Macedonia
- Denomination: Eastern Orthodox Church

Mihail (Macedonian: Архиепископ Охридски и Македонски г.г. Михаил, romanized: Arhiepiskop Ohridski i Makedonski g.g. Mihail) (20 March 1912 – 6 July 1999) was an Archbishop of Ohrid and Macedonia. He established the first Macedonian Orthodox parish outside Yugoslavia.

Archbishop Mihail was born in Novo Selo, Ottoman Empire (present-day North Macedonia) in 1912. He had been a longstanding professor and dean at the theological faculty of the Ss. Cyril and Methodius University in Skopje before being elected as the leader of the Macedonian Orthodox Church on December 4, 1993.

Archbishop Mihail died on July 6, 1999, and is remembered for his great oratory.

Preceded by Gabriel II	Archbishop of Ohrid and Macedonia; 1993–1999	Succeeded by Stephen
