= List of heads of the Macedonian Orthodox Church =

Archbishop of Ohrid and Macedonia
- Archbishopric

Eastern Orthodox
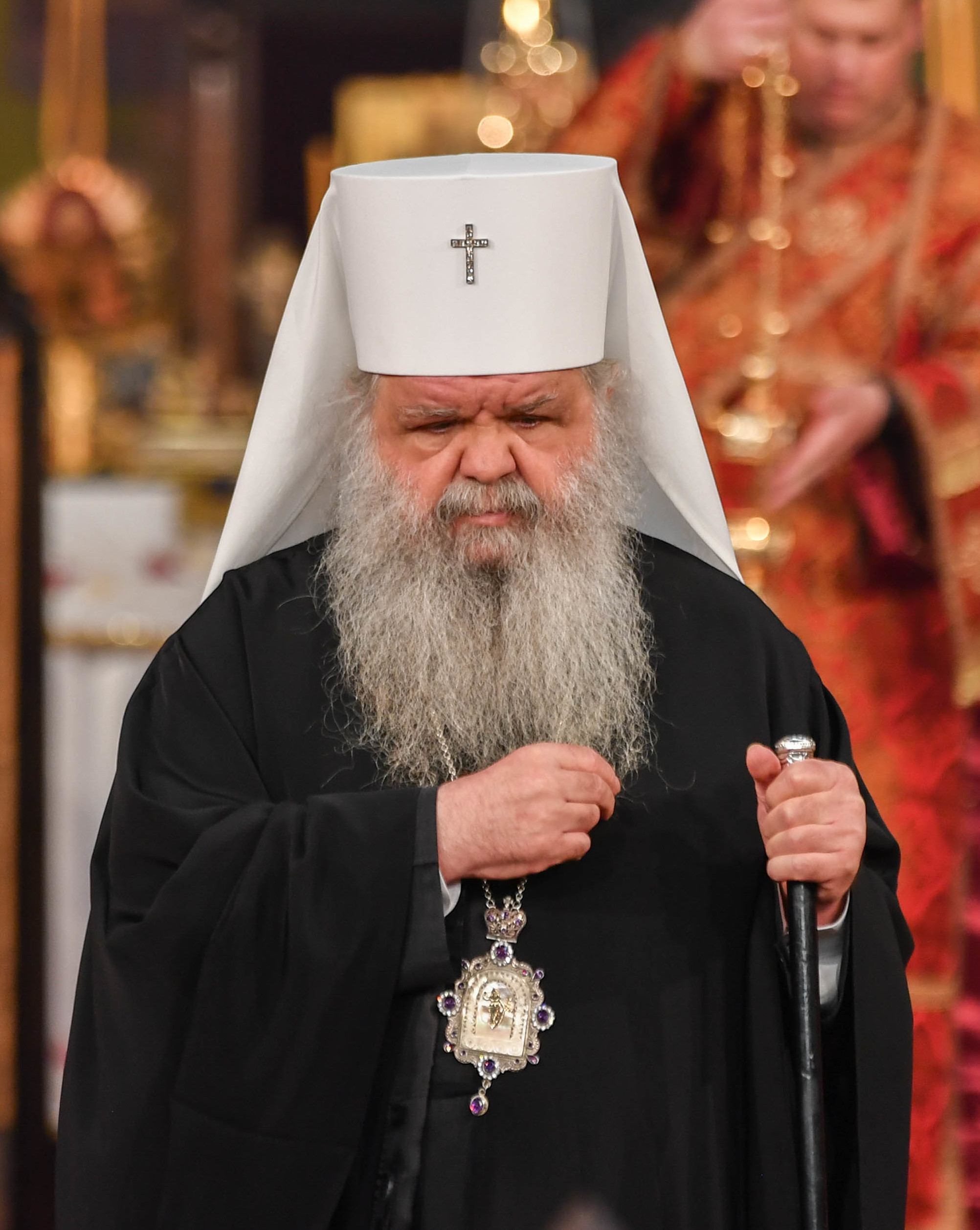
- Incumbent: Stefan since 10 October 1999
- Style: His Beatitude

Location
- Residence: Church of St. Clement of Ohrid, Skopje; Church of Saint Sophia, Ohrid

Information
- First holder: Dositej II
- Denomination: Eastern Orthodox
- Established: 1959

Website
- mpc.org.mk

Archbishop of Ohrid and Macedonia (Macedonian: Архиепископ Охридски и Македонски) is the title given to the primate of the Macedonian Orthodox Church. The Archbishop of Ohrid and Macedonia exercises jurisdiction over Eastern Orthodox members in the Republic of North Macedonia and in exarchates in the diaspora.

The current archbishop of Ohrid and Macedonia is Stefan Veljanovski, who was elected in 1999 following the death of Archbishop Mihail Gogov.

== History ==
On 4 October 1958, the group of bishops in the SR Macedonia uncanonically declared Dositej the "Archbishop of Ohrid, and Skopje, and Metropolitan of Macedonia" in Ohrid. Following the Communist regime's pressure, the Bishops' Council of the Serbian Orthodox Church retroactively recognized Dositej as the Metropolitan of Skopje on 19 June 1959. Despite the canonical order, Dositej and two other bishops established an "autonomous synod", which in order to preserve peace, was formalized by the Serbian Orthodox Assembly, after commitments that certain irregularities be removed. However, in an assembly in Ohrid on 19 July 1967, the autocephality of the Macedonian Orthodox Church was uncanonically proclaimed, the move not recognized by the Serbian Orthodox Church nor any other autocephalous church, leading to a schism. Dositej and the other bishops of the schismatic Orthodox Church in Macedonia were indicted in the Serbian Orthodox Church court.

On 16 May 2022, Archbishop Stefan became the first Archbishop of Ohrid to be canonically recognized since Dositej, owing to the resolution by the Holy Synod of the Serbian Orthodox Church to accept the canonical status of the Macedonian Orthodox Church.

== List of archbishops of Ohrid and Macedonia ==
Name	Portrait	Reign	Birth Name	Title
Dositheus II		1967–1981	Dimitrije Stojković	Archbishop of Ohrid and Macedonia
Angelarios		1981–1986	Cvetko Krsteski	Archbishop of Ohrid and Macedonia
Gabriel II		1986–1993	Ǵorǵi Milošev	Archbishop of Ohrid and Macedonia
Michael		1993–1999	Metodi Gogov	Archbishop of Ohrid and Macedonia
Stephen		1999–present	Stojan Veljanovski	Archbishop of Ohrid and Macedonia

== See also ==
- Archbishop of Ohrid
- Orthodox Ohrid Archbishopric
