= Dositej II of Ohrid and Macedonia =

First Archbishop of Ohrid and Macedonia

His Beatitude Dositej II
- Metropolitan of Skopje and Archbishop of Ohrid and Macedonia
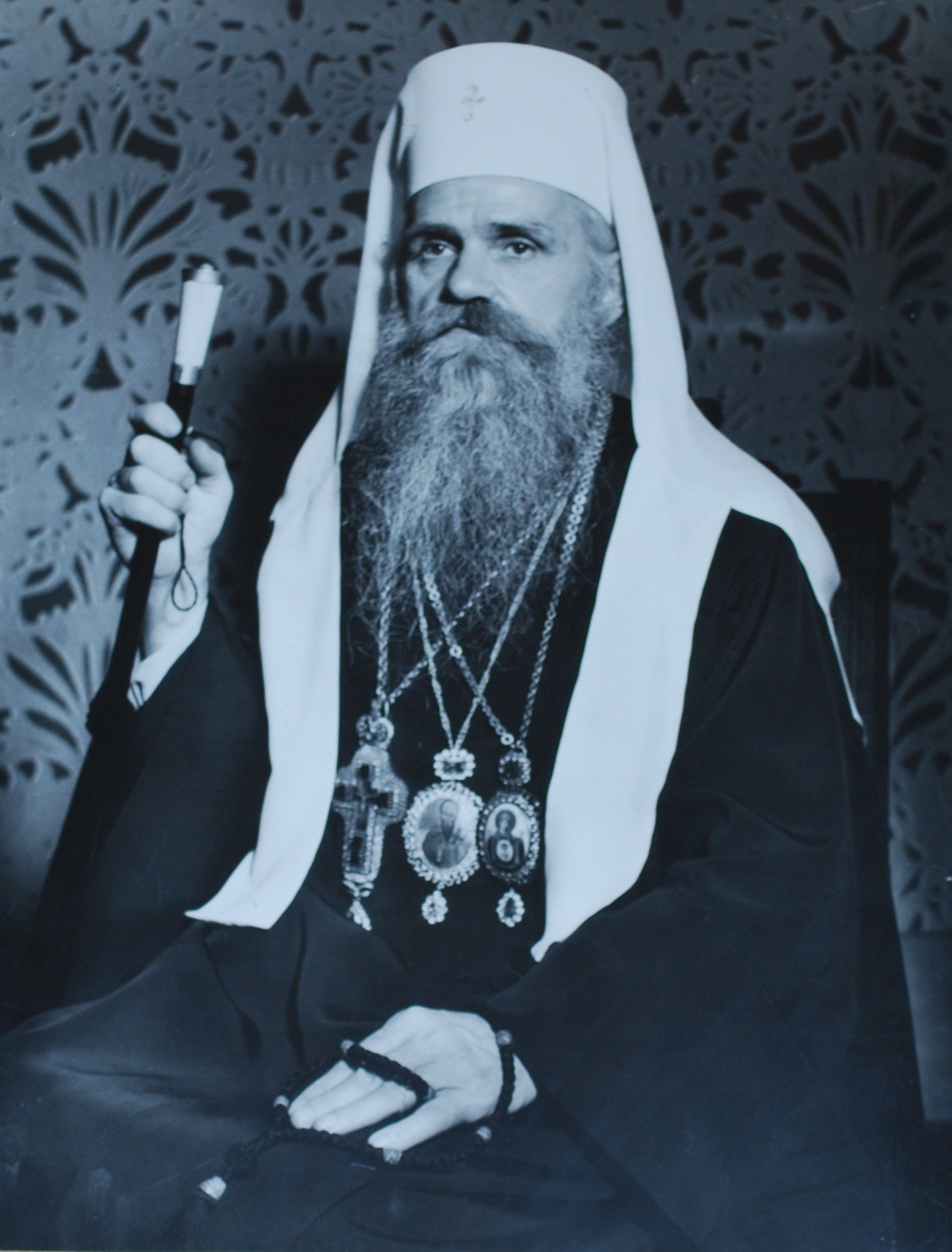
- Church: Serbian Orthodox Church (until 1967); Macedonian Orthodox Church (from 1967)
- See: Skopje
- Installed: 1959
- Term ended: 1967
- Predecessor: (Function established)
- Successor: Angelarij
- Other post: Bishop of Toplica (1951–58)

Orders
- Consecration: 1951

Personal details
- Born: Dimitrije Stojković; 7 December 1906 Smederevo, Kingdom of Serbia
- Died: 20 May 1981 (aged 74) Skopje, SR Macedonia, SFR Yugoslavia
- Buried: Church of St. Demetrius, Skopje
- Denomination: Eastern Orthodoxy
- Education: Bitola theological school

Dositej II (Macedonian: Доситеј II; English: Dositheus II; 7 December 1906 – 20 May 1981) was the Metropolitan of Skopje, under the canonical jurisdiction of the Serbian Orthodox Church from 1959 to 1967, and uncanonically Archbishop of Ohrid and Macedonia (primate) of the Macedonian Orthodox Church until his death in 1981.

== Biography ==
He was born as Dimitrije Stojković (Serbian Cyrillic: Димитрије Стојковић) on 7 December 1906 in Smederevo, Kingdom of Serbia, to father Lazar and mother Sofija. His family were Serbian Patriarchists from Mavrovo, Ottoman Macedonia. He finished primary school and gymnasium in Belgrade. Dositej entered the theological school in Sremski Karlovci in 1922 but did not finish his theological education there. He took monastic vows in the Kičevo Monastery in 1924. Between 1924 and 1932 he was a fellowman of Hilandar and then Gračanica. He finished the Theological Seminary of St. John in Bitola in 1937. He graduated from the Theological Faculty in Belgrade in 1942. In 1947 he was appointed administrator of the Patriarchal Court in Sremski Karlovci, and in 1948 he was appointed as an archimandrite.

The Assembly of the Serbian Orthodox Church appointed archimandrite Dositej as vicar bishop of Toplica in 1951, as an aide bishop to the Serbian Patriarch for Macedonian Affairs to the Serbian Patriarch, Vikentije II. He was included in negotiations to resolve contentious church issues in Macedonia. At the end of 1951, the "Initiative Board" in Skopje demanded from patriarch Vikentije II that Metropolitan of Skopje, Josif Cvijović, be replaced by bishop Dositej. Although the demand was not met, it was followed by several in the coming years, with growing support from the regime. On 4 October 1958, Dositej was uncanonically proclaimed the "Archbishop of Ohrid, and Skopje, and Metropolitan of Macedonia" in an assembly in Ohrid.

The Assembly of the Serbian Orthodox Church, after its 3–19 June 1959 session, recognized Dositej as the Metropolitan of Skopje. Despite the canonical order, Dositej and two other bishops established the "Synod of the Autonomous Orthodox Church in SR Macedonia". In order to preserve peace, the Serbian Orthodox Assembly formalized Dositej's decisions, as he had committed to that certain irregularities in the constitution of the Macedonian Church be removed. However, in the following years it was shown that gaining autonomy was only an intermediate step towards requesting autocephaly.

In an assembly in Ohrid in 1967, the autocephaly of the Macedonian Orthodox Church was proclaimed, leading to an open schism since the move was not recognized by the Serbian Orthodox Church nor any other autocephalous church. Dositej and the other bishops of the schismatic Macedonian Orthodox Church were indicted in the Serbian Orthodox Church court. In the coming years there were repeated negotiations on settlement, but without results. He died on 20 May 1981, in Skopje, SR Macedonia (now in North Macedonia).

== Sources ==
- Slijepčević, Đoko M. (1958). The Macedonian Question: The Struggle for Southern Serbia. Chicago: The American Institute for Balkan Affairs.
- Вуковић, Сава (1996). Српски јерарси од деветог до двадесетог века (Serbian Hierarchs from the 9th to the 20th Century). Београд: Евро.
- Пузовић, Предраг (1999). "Раскол у Српској православној цркви - македонско црквено питање (The Rift in the Serbian Orthodox Church - The Macedonian Church Issue)". Вардарски зборник (1): 155–173.

Eastern Orthodox Church titles
Preceded by Josif Cvijović	Metropolitan of Skopje of the Serbian Orthodox Church; 1959–1967	Vacant Title next held by Jovan Vraniškovski
New title	Archbishop of Ohrid and Macedonia of the Macedonian Orthodox Church; 1967–1981	Succeeded by Angelarij
