= Macedonian Orthodox Diocese of America and Canada =

Diocese of the Macedonian Orthodox Church

Coordinates: 43.7084°N 79.3408°W

Diocese of America and Canada Епархија Американско Канадска
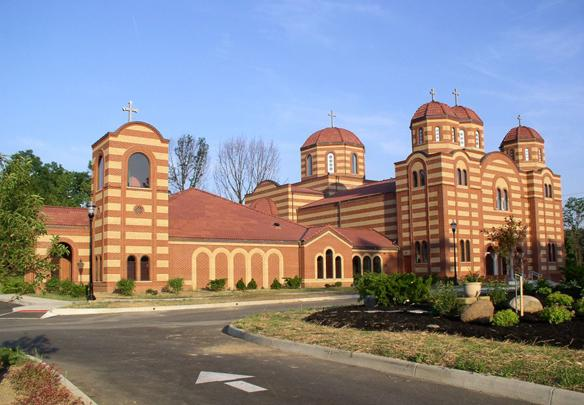
- Macedonian Orthodox Cathedral of the Dormition of the Virgin Mary in Reynoldsburg, Ohio

Location
- Territory: United States, Canada
- Headquarters: North Macedonia

Information
- Denomination: Eastern Orthodox
- Established: 1981
- Language: Church Slavonic; Macedonian; English

Current leadership
- Bishop: Methodius

The Macedonian Orthodox Diocese of America and Canada (Macedonian: Американско-канадска епархија, romanized: Amerikansko-kanadska eparhija) is one of 10 dioceses of the Macedonian Orthodox Church. Operating a near total of forty churches in Canada and the United States, the diocese is headed by Metropolitan Methodius.

== History ==
The Macedonian Orthodox Church (MOC) created its first diocese in 1967 for Macedonian diaspora communities that covered Canada, the United States, Australia and New Zealand. By 1981, the MOC split the diocese into two parts creating a diocese for Australia and New Zealand and another diocese for Canada and the United States.

Metropolitan Methodius was placed to oversee the diocese in 2006. It was restructured after he went to the United States were the diocese was split as 3 regencies, the Midwest regency and East regency for the United States, and a Canadian regency. The Midwest regency has its seat in Crown Point, Indiana, led by Tome Stamatov, Father Branko Postolovski is in charge of the East regency, based in Syracuse, New York, and Father Trajko Boseovski oversees the Canadian regency located in Toronto, Canada.

== Demographics ==
In 2010, the Diocese had 20 parishes in the United States with 15,513 congregants, but only 1700 attended regularly. There are no monasteries.

== See also ==
- List of churches in the Macedonian Orthodox Diocese of America and Canada
