= Anti-Ottoman revolts of 1565–1572 =

Rebellions against the Ottoman Empire

The anti-Ottoman revolts of 1567–1572 were a series of conflicts between Albanian, Greek and other rebels and the Ottoman Empire. Social tensions intensified at this time by the debilitation of the Ottoman administration, the chronic economic crisis, and arbitrary conduct of the Ottoman state authorities. The leaders of the uprisings were initially successful and controlled several strategic locations and fortresses, especially in Albania, Central Greece, and the Peloponnese. However, the movement lacked the necessary organization. They were instigated and assisted by western powers; mainly by the Republic of Venice, and the victory of the Holy League against the Ottoman fleet in the Battle of Lepanto, in November 1571, triggered further revolutionary activity. However, Venice withdrew its support to the rebels and signed a unilateral peace with the Ottomans. As such the rebellions were doomed to end and the Ottoman forces committed a number of massacres in the aftermath of the revolt during the suppression of the uprising. Throughout the pacification process, various primarily isolated areas were still out of Ottoman control and new rebellions erupted, like that of Dionysios Skylosophos in 1611.

== Background ==
Social tensions intensified by the debilitation of the Ottoman administration, as well as chronic economic crisis and arbitrary conduct of the Ottoman authorities. Under this context during the 16th century various Orthodox communities lost their social and economic privileges that had been formerly recognized by Ottoman decrees. Additionally, extensive imposition of extraordinary taxation by the Ottoman authorities in the Greek mainland and forced conscription to meet the increased demand of the Ottoman navy further deteriorated the situation. Instances of widespread destruction of churches and systematic plundering of religious property were also recorded in contemporary sources.

As a result of this kind of intensified oppression and arbitrary rule the local populations hoped for a military intervention by a Christian power. Under this context news arrived that the fleet of the Holy League will advance towards Greek inhabited regions of the Ottoman Empire. Representatives of the Greek communities made several appeals for assistance against Ottoman rule. Additionally, the Greek diaspora at Venice, Naples and in other western European cities also hoped for an armed struggle that would end Ottoman rule. As such armed preparations to overthrow Ottoman authorities had begun among the Greek communities in the Ottoman Empire.

Various Greek representatives from the Peloponnese, such as Petros Menagias and Georgios Meizoteros, as well as Ioannis Varelis and Ioannis Akkidas have become active agents for the Spanish Empire. In various spying missions they contacted with religious figures in the area. In Corfu Alexios Rartouros was also cooperating with the Spanish and came in contact with various nobles from Epirus; Nikolaos Malmniotis and Michael Kolouris. Mani, a region known for its frequent revolts against the Ottoman authorities has received both Venetian and Spanish agents. However, Spanish involvement in Ottoman ruled Greek regions inevitably triggered Venetian concerns. With the outbreak of the Ottoman–Venetian War in spring 1570 Venice decided that drastic action was needed especially after the Ottoman attack on Cyprus. Venetian policy also dictated the need of support towards revolutionary movements among the Greek populations. Under this context the Greek diaspora leaving in Venice proved crucial and mobilization within the local Greek Brotherhood was intense. One prominent of its prominent members scholar Grigorios Malaxos, suggested fomenting a revolutionary movement in Greek territory, which would be supported by the Ecumenical Patriarch Metrophanes III.

John of Austria also send agent to various Greek regions for the preparations of revolutionary activity.

== Activity in 1565 - March 1571 ==
=== Albania ===
The main centers of revolt in Ottoman Albania were the Himara region and the Dukagjin highlands. Rebels from these areas had even attempted to coordinate their actions at times, such as during a meeting at the Cape of Rodon in 1551.

In Northern Albania, large scale rebellions had erupted in Dukagjin in 1565-1566, as well as in 1568 when the Ottomans had tried to tax the non-Muslims. By October 1570, 37 Albanian villages of the Ulcinj area, as well as elders of villages near Shkodër had requested the Venetian governor for aid in anti-Ottoman operations since most Ottoman forces had left to quell the revolt in Himara. Led by Bartolomeo Dukagjin (possibly of the noble Albanian Dukagjini family) and supported by the Venetians, the Albanian rebels captured the town of Lezhë in December 1570. Almost simultaneously, another revolt erupted in the region of Mat. Alarmed by the spread of the rebellions, between December 1570 and March 1571, the Sultan ordered local Ottoman authorities to gather a force of janissaries and cavalry to attack Lezhë. Ottoman forces under Ahmed Pasha advanced from Skopje to Albania, then northwest towards Ulcinj, overcoming a combined Venetian-Albanian force on the river Buna before reaching Ulcinj itself. The defenders finally surrendered the city after the Ottoman fleet of Ali Muezzinzade Pasha and Pertev Pasha appeared in front of the city.

In Southern Albania rebellion erupted in 1566 in Himara and the surrounding region following an Ottoman attempt to impose regular taxation. The rebels defeated an Ottoman army of 8.000-10.000 and offered Venice support for a potential Venetian invasion of Albania.

In spring 1570 Venetian administration in Corfu sent the stratiot Meksha Gjerbësi in the hinterland of Vlorë with the aim to "subvert countless villages" in the area. Meksha Gjerbësi was chosen for this task because he was Albanian speaking.

Meetings between the Venetian provveditore of Corfu Sebastiano Venier and the elders of the villages of Himara were held in March 1570. Himariots promised Venier that they would revolt against the Ottomans, while requesting on their side artillery and provisions. Furthermore Himariots would have obtained a wide autonomy under the protection of the Republic of Venice once freed from Ottoman rule. After the meetings the Venetian provveditore informed the Senate that "in a short time, such a large number of Albanians will gather, that getting a little garrison of people and of weapons from us, they will easily do any enterprise and we will get the whole country of Albania".

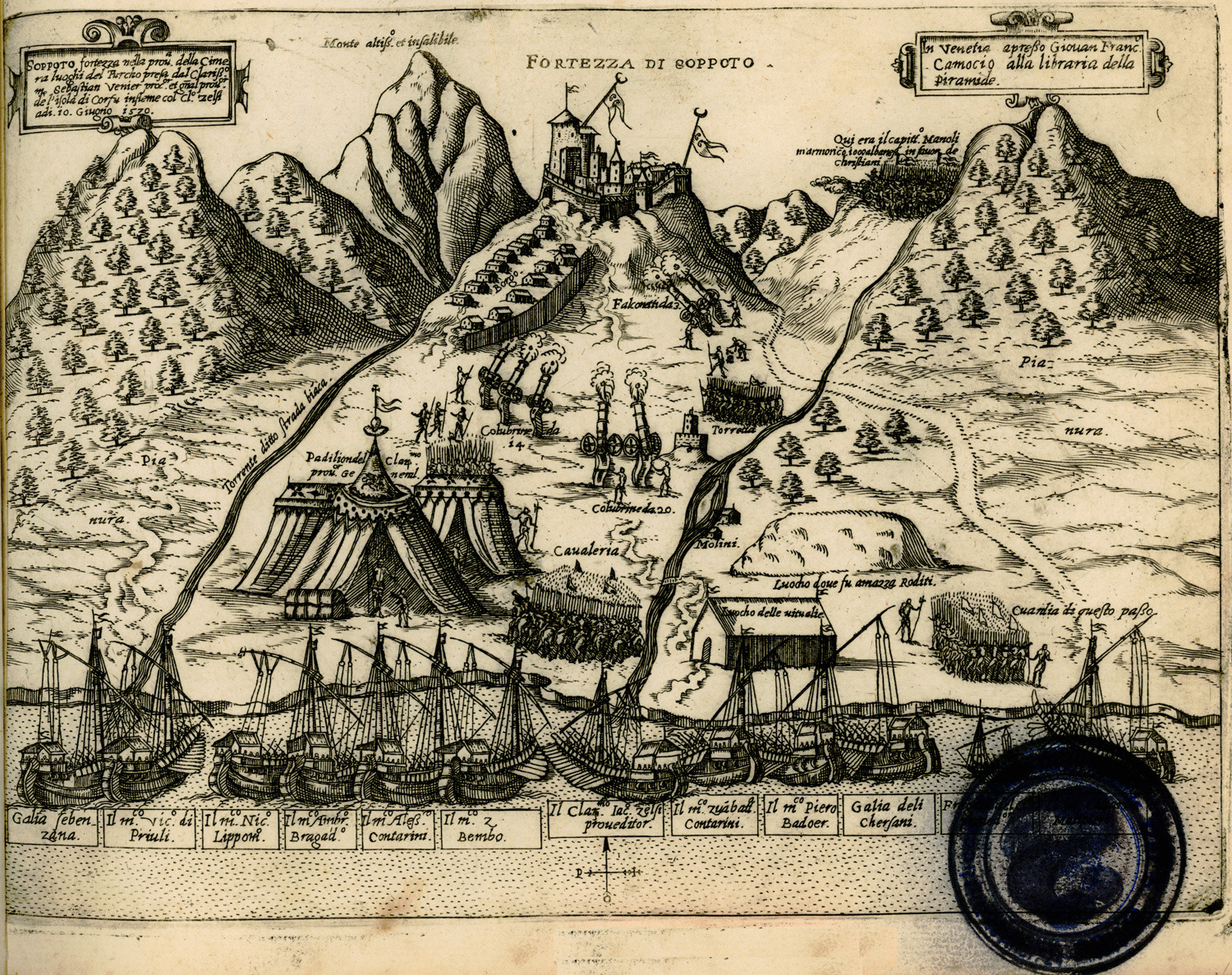
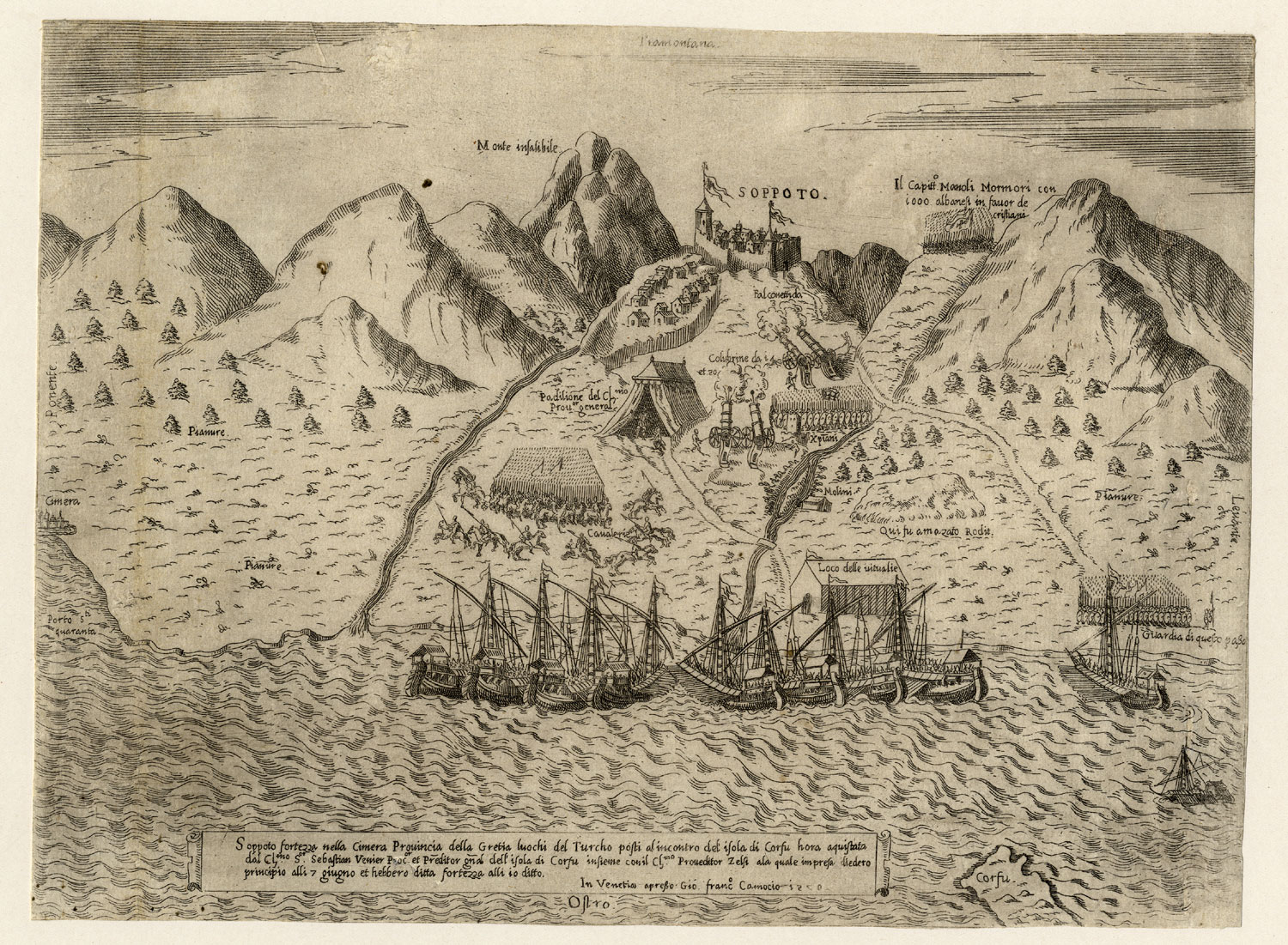
Drawings of the Sopot fortress in 1570 during capture by Venetian ships. Manoli Mormori (Emmanuel Mormoris) is depicted in the "Sopot fortress of Himara in Greece"... "with 1000 Albanians having captured one of the surrounding hills in favor of Christians".

Emmanuel Mormoris and a small Venetian force, having raised the local Albanians in rebellion against the Ottomans, assaulted Ottoman fortresses in the Himara region.

As soon as military operations began, Emmanuel Mormoris proposed the capture of the coastal fortress of Castle of Sopot across Corfu. The revolt in the coastal region of Himara received the support of both local Albanian and Greek elements and as a result it came under Venetian control. In 1570, the rebels captured the Sopot, where a small number of Venetian mercenaries under Mormoris were installed.

Mormoris with a force composed of his soldiers and a large number of Albanians proceeded to siege of the coastal fortress of Nivice in March 1571. In April 1571, the Ottomans sent two ships to Himara for tax collection and offered amnesty for the rebels. His offer was rejected and 6000 Albanian rebels from Himara and the nearby villages instead attacked and killed 350 Ottoman soldiers. The Albanians then called upon Mormoris and his mercenaries in Sopot Castle to attack the Ottomans.

The Albanian army and the Venetian mercenaries assaulted the castle at Kardhiq, but were driven back. Mormoris advanced to the garrison of Kardhiq during this stage he took hostages from local Albanian families and asked for further reinforcement from Corfu. He was finally driven back. Mormoris was subsequently captured during the Ottoman advance on Sopot Castle.

=== Greece ===
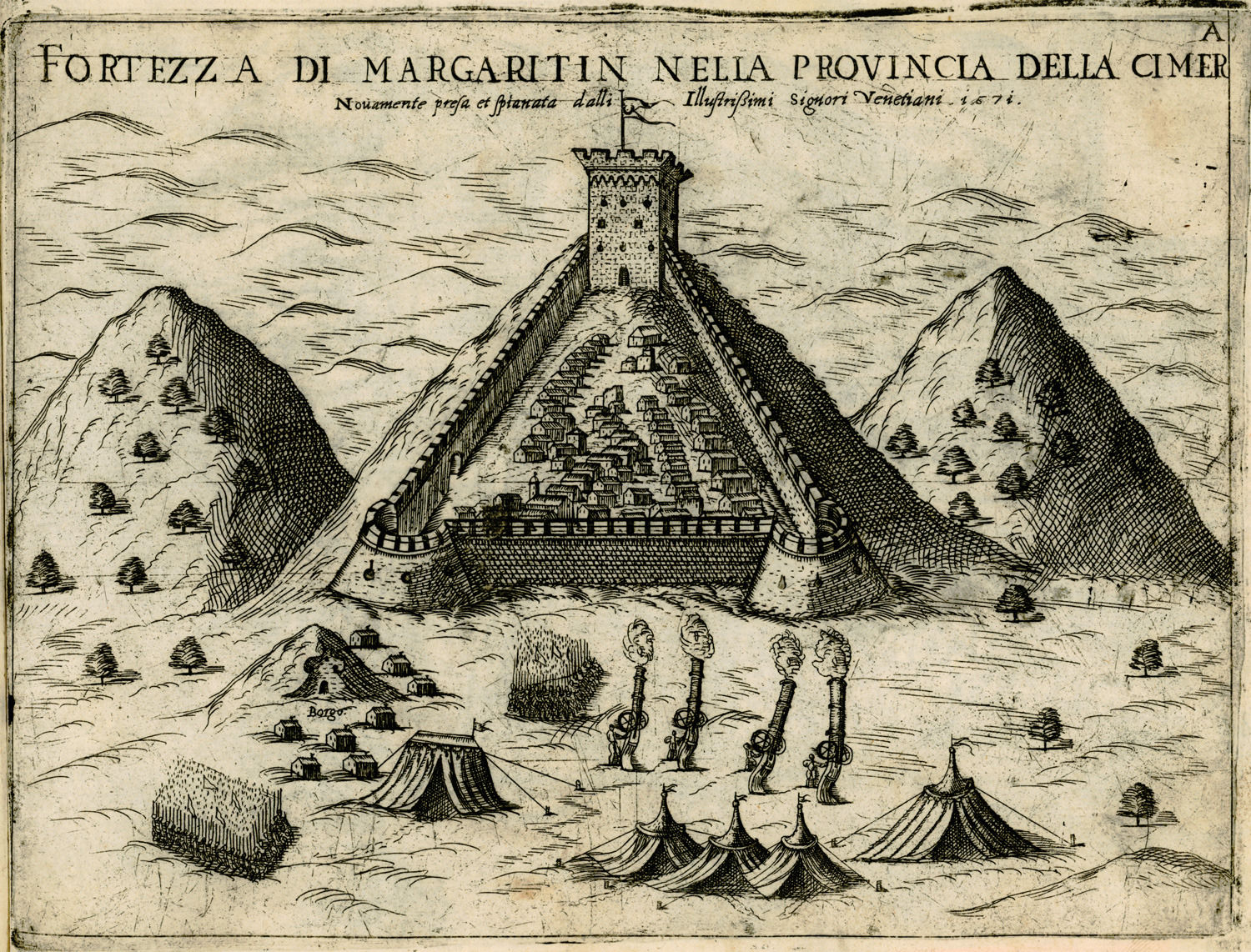
The castle of Margariti under Venetian siege (1571).

An Ottoman attack against the Venetian possessions of Parga, Corfu and Zakynthos met the resistance of the local Greek population. In the case of Corfu the defence was organized by Georgios Mormoris, brother of Emmanouel, and a force of 100 Greek stradioti and 500 infantry troops.

The uprising spread to various parts of Epirus under with the guidance of local Greek nobles and various Stratioti military leaders such as Petros Lantzas. The revolt in this coastal region of Thesprotia received the support of both local Albanian and Greek elements and as a result it came under Venetian control. In the successful siege operation against Margariti participated units from Corfu, elements from the local population as well as Greek military units of the Venetian army. In the mean time, according to Venetian reports Lantzas managed to kill the Ottoman commander of Paramythia.

Meanwhile, the inhabitants of the Mani Peninsula on the southern edge of the Peloponnese revolted in the autumn of 1567. The Maniot rebels received reinforcement by volunteers from the region of Ioannina, who were landed there by a Spanish fleet that consisted of twenty five galleys. In the summer of 1569, an Ottoman fortress was erected in a strategic location in Mani to monitor rebellious activity. After a short decline, the rebellion reached a new momentum and the newly erected fortress was captured in the summer of 1570 with the support of a Venetian force.

== Battle of Lepanto and aftermath (November 1571) ==
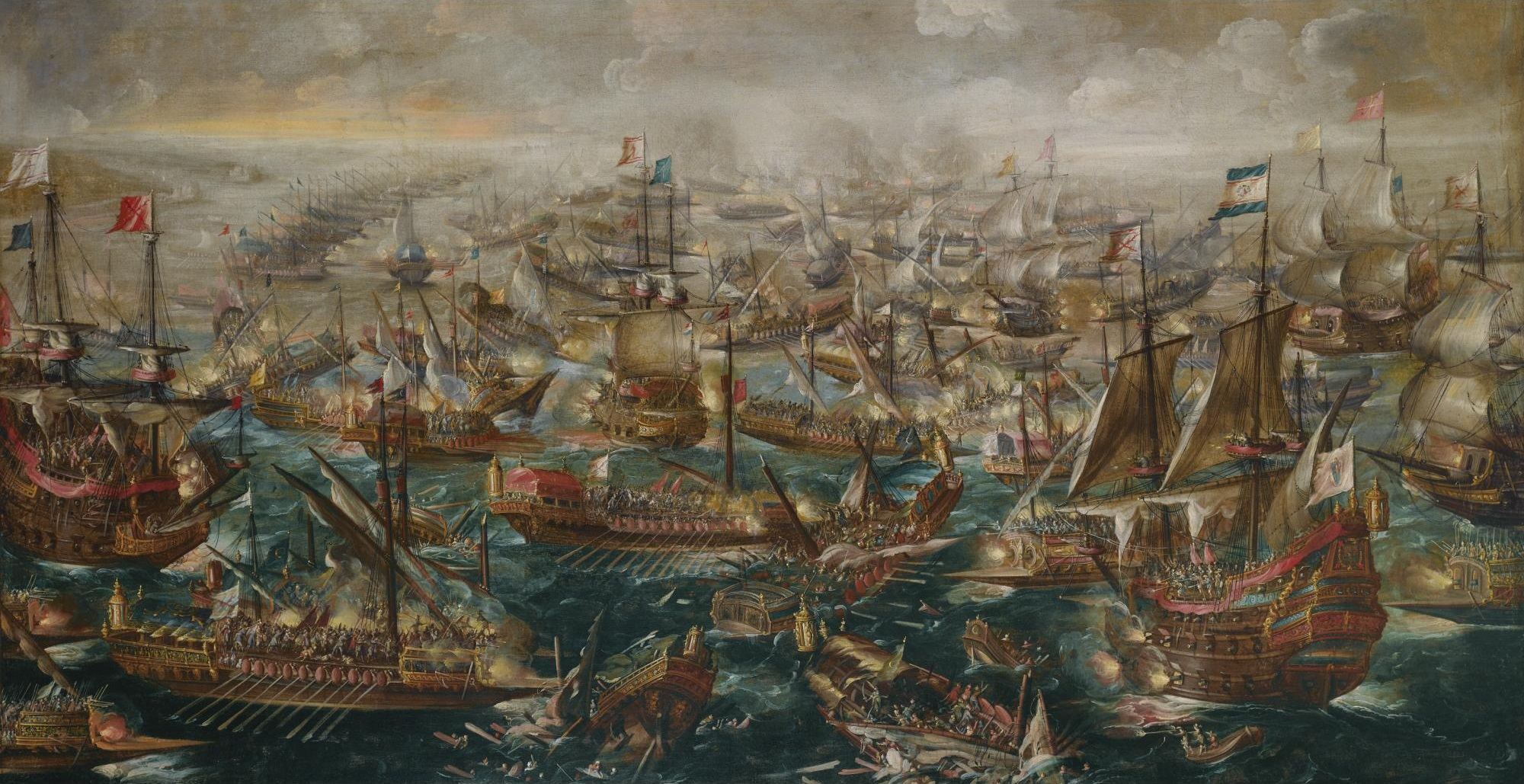
The Battle of Lepanto of 1571, by Andries van Eertvelt. Historian George Finlay stated that the number of the Greek in this conflict "far exceeded that of the combatants of any of the nations engaged".

The Battle of Lepanto took place off the coast of Patras in the Ionian Sea on 10–14 November 1571. A significant number of Greeks participated in the conflict on the side of the Holy League, while three Venetian galleys were commanded by Greek captains. Additionally many Greek rowers serving on Turkish galleys managed to seize them with mutiny and deliver them in time to the Christian allies.

The Battle of Lepanto resulted in the defeat of the Ottoman fleet by the Holy League. As a result Greek-Venetian activities reached a new momentum and the leaders of the Orthodox Greek communities continued to invest their resources and energy for the purpose of uprooting Ottoman rule.

News of the Christian victory spread immediately in the nearby region of Patras where the inhabitants rejoiced in the destruction of the Ottoman fleet. The local metropolitan bishop, Germanos, and the local nobility joined the movement. Soon after armed units were formed and expelled the Ottoman garrison. Meanwhile, some Ottoman crews that managed to flee from the victorious Christian fleet and landed on the nearby coast of Peloponnese were annihilated by the insurgents. The rebellion was soon spread to nearby regions in the Peloponnese and central Greece, namely Aigio, Galaxidi, Lidoriki and Salona. Germanos also managed to be in contact with the revolutionaries of Mani as well as the major figures of the Holy League fleet. Major role in the spread of the movement played the hegumen of the Taxiarchs Monastery at Aigio and the local lord Ioannis Tsernotabeis.

In Epirus, the combined Greek-Venetian force was again successful at the siege of Margariti . As a result a region stretching south of Gjirokastër down to Parga came under rebel control. Among the revolutionary leaders, the Stratioti Georgio Renesi became active in Lefkada and Arta. Moreover, the religious leaders of the Greek communities in and around Ioannina and Aetolia-Akarnania initiated secret communications with the Venetians to overthrow their local Ottoman authorities.

== 1571-1572 ==
After the Christian victory a multitude of Greeks went to Spain to seek support. Large-scale unrest occurred in additional parts of the Ottoman Empire: in the islands of Aegina and Lefkada the Christian inhabitants rose in revolt, while in Naxos they declined to pay the jizya tax owed by the Christian subjects of the Empire. Revolts were also noted in islands such as Andros, Paros, Rodos, Kos, Karpathos, Imbros, Skiathos, Chios, Agios Efstratios and Lesbos, as well as on the Asia Minor coast around Smyrna, Phocaea and Cheshme. Thessaly, northern Euboea and parts of Macedonia, including Thessaloniki and Serres, also witnessed revolutionary activity. Incidents of unrest were reported even at Constantinople once news of the Ottoman defeat reached the city.

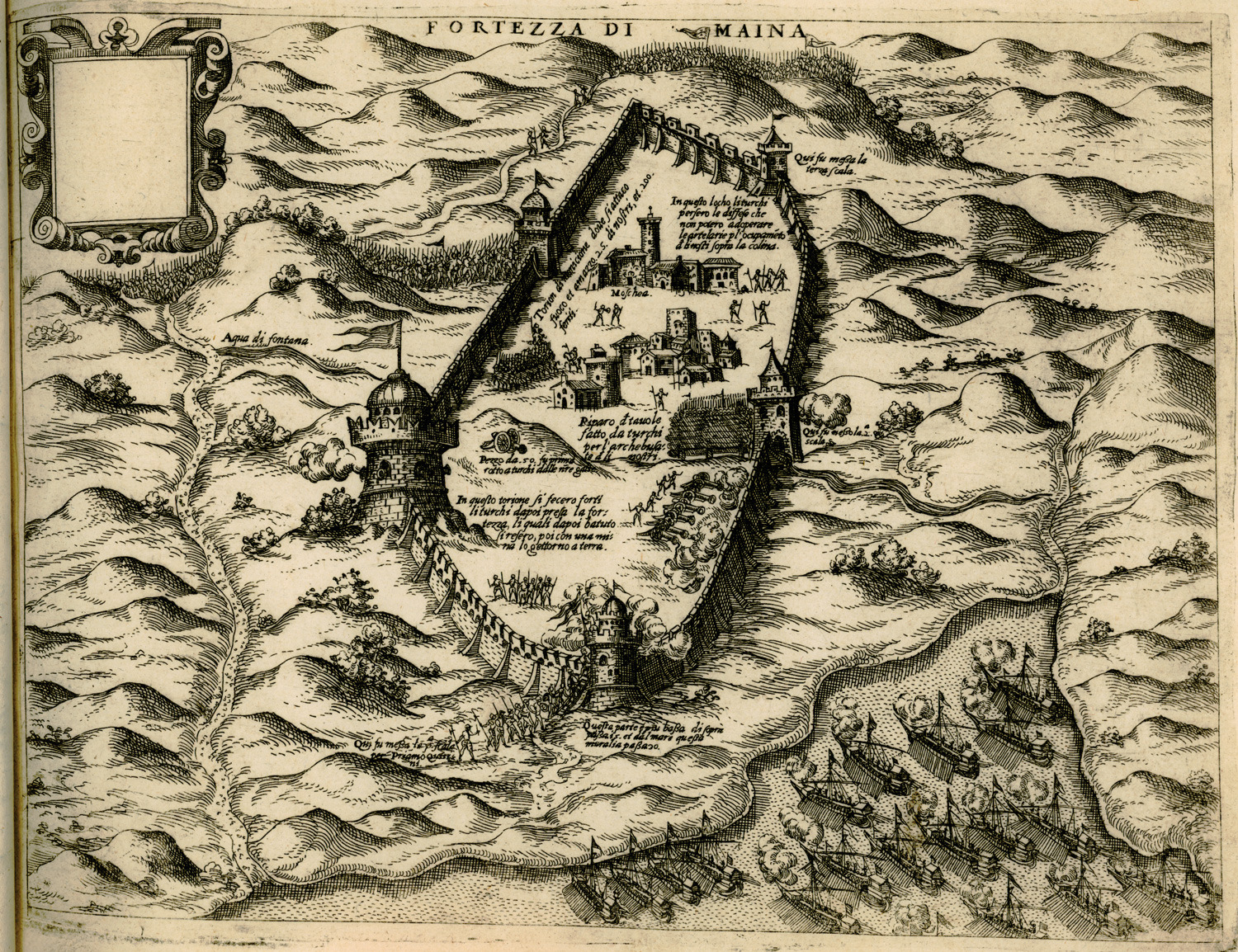
Castle in Mani at 1574, by C. G. Francesco

Meanwhile Emmenouel's brother Zorzis Mormoris, commanded units of Stratioti in Margariti, Santa Maura (Lefkada), and Corfu. The Venetian landing operation in Lefkada at January 31, 1572 was supported by Greek stradioti as well as of units from the Ionian islands, the coast of Epirus and Cretans who had previously fought at Lepanto. Ottoman reinforcements from the nearby regions soon marched towards Lefkada and Lepanto. Meanwhile, on April 18, Ottoman units marched towards the Agia Mavra and Neos Pyrgos garrisons (Rio and Antirrio) in the vicinity of Lepanto.

In this context the Greeks living in Venice proved crucial and mobilization within the local Scuola dei Greci was intense. Scholar Grigorios Malaxos suggested fomenting a revolutionary movement in Greek territory, which would be supported by the Ecumenical Patriarch Metrophanes III. However, in 1572 it became apparent that the Venetians were about to sign a peace treaty with the Ottomans. As a result, the Greeks that had cooperated with the Venetians turned to the Kingdom of Naples, then part of the Spanish Empire, for support. The rebels in Mani approached the Spanish, while others, such as Manthos Papagiannis and Panos Kestolikos, visited Don Juan, commander-in-chief of the Holly Alliance. Additionally, the metropolitan bishop of Monemvasia, Makarios Melissenos, and his brother, Theodore, initiated negotiations with both the Spanish and the Venetians. At March 1572 the metropolitan bishop of Grevena, Timotheos, proposed a plan to Pope Pius V that an expeditionary force from the western European countries should meet the rebels in the plain of Thessaloniki and from there they should attack Constantinople.

During April 1572 the rebellion was still active in parts of Mani and Monemvasia. The Ottomans sent a large army as well as naval forces which attacked the rebellious provinces and compelled Emmanuel Mormoris to retreat to the castle of Sopot, where he was later arrested. In October 1572 an attempt by Spain to land reinforcements in the coastal towns of Pylos and Modon failed. At following May the inhabitants of Aetoliko in Akarnania established contacts with representative of the Venetian units nearby. They asked for support by Greek stratioti units and they immediately received a unit consisting of 80 men from Zakynthos by orders of Sebastiano Venier, as well as weapons and ammunition.

== Suppression and aftermath ==
=== Greece ===
As a result of the Venetian withdrawal from the region the rebellion was doomed to end. Venice finally decided to sign a unilateral peace with the Ottomans in 1573. On the other hand, Spain continued to encourage insurrections against the Ottoman Empire and acceded to the petitions of various rebels and potential rebels. However, due to bad organization the uprising was finally suppressed and most of the leaders were executed by the Ottomans. Ottoman suppression was harsh in Patras and the city became almost deserted in the following years. Among those executed were several nobles, among them metropolitan bishop Germanos, and the local nobility were mutilated. Those revolutionary leader from northwestern Peloponnese who managed to survive were later located at Mani where the anti-Ottoman activity was still preserved.

In Ioannina the Ottoman governor under the pretext that local nobles were in contact with Venetian and Spanish spies proposed the expulsion of the entire Christian community from the castle and their replacement with Muslim settlers. As a result during the last quarter of the 16th century Greek refugees fled to nearby Venetian-controlled areas, in particular the Ionian islands. The victims of the Ottoman reprisals are estimated to c. 30,000.

In Greece, new uprisings occurred in both the mainland and the islands in 1573-1574, where the Archbishop of Ohrid, Joakim, was involved in discussions and preparations in order to organize an uprising against the Ottoman Empire.

=== Albania ===
After the battle of Lepanto revolutionary movements in Himara were organized by metropolitan bishop Joakim of Ochrid.

In 1577, 38 chieftains of the Himara region, signing as the Albanian elders of the Himara, appealed to Pope Gregory XIII for arms and supplies. They also reported that their fellow Albanians of Zhulat had recently battled the Ottomans and, with great losses for both sides. They promised to switch allegiance from the Orthodox to the Roman Catholic Church, and recognize Philip II of Spain as their sovereign, under condition that they retain their Orthodox liturgical customs.

== Legacy ==
The period c. 1570-1620 witnessed the first major wave of large scale uprisings in the Greek peninsula after the Fall of Constantinople (1453). Contemporary Ottoman records usual preserve descriptions of the events in various codices of the correspondent era. Both Greek and Ottoman contemporary literature agree that heavy taxation imposed on the Christian subjects of the regions was one of the main reasons that triggered the revolt.

== Sources ==
- Brewer, David (16 April 2012). Greece, the Hidden Centuries: Turkish Rule from the Fall of Constantinople to Greek Independence. Bloomsbury Publishing. ISBN 978-0-85772-167-9.
- Konstantinos, Giakoumis (2002). The monasteries of Jorgucat and Vanishte in Dropull and of Spelaio in Lunxheri as monuments and institutions during the Ottoman period in Albania (16th-19th centuries) (PhD thesis). University of Birmingham. p. 22.
- Hasiotis, Ioannis; Guirao, Motos (2008). Tendiendo Puentes en el Mediterráneo: Estudios Sobre las Relaciones Hispano-Griegas (ss. XV-XIX) (in Spanish). Granada: Centro de Estudios Bizantinos, Neogriegos y Chipriotas, University of Granada. ISBN 978-84-95905-28-4.
- Hasiotis, Ioannis (1970). Οι Έλληνες στις παραμονές της ναυμαχίας της Ναυπάκτου: Εκκλήσεις, επαναστατικές κινήσεις και εξεγέρσεις στην Ελληνική χερσόνησο απο τις παραμονές ως το τέλος του Κυπριακού πολέμου (1568-1571) [The Greeks on the Eve of the Battle of Lepanto: Appeals, Revolutionary Movements and Uprisings in the Greek Peninsula from the Eve until the End of the War of Cyprus (1568-1571)] (in Greek). Thessaloniki: Society for Macedonian Studies.
- Hasiotis, Dimitrios (2011). "Anti-Turkish Movements in Macedonia before the 1821 Greek Revolution" (PDF). Modern and Contemporary Macedonia. 1.
- Hatzopoulos, Dionysios (1993). "Greek Officers in the Eighteenth Century Venetian Army". The Journal of Modern Hellenism. 10: 157–165. ISSN 0743-7749.
- Kotzageorgis, Fokion (2008). "Εξεγέρσεις στην Ελληνική χερσόνησο τον 16ο αι. και Οθωμανικές πηγές: Μια πρώτη προσέγγιση" [16th-century Revolts in the Greek Peninsula and Ottoman Sources: A First Approach] (PDF). ΚΘ΄ Πανελλήνιο Ιστορικό Συνέδριο, 16-18 Μαΐου 2008 & ΚΗ΄ Πανελλήνιο Ιστορικό Συνέδριο (Μέρος Β΄), 25-27 Μαΐου 2007. Πρακτικά [XXVIII Panhellenic Historical Conference, 16–18 May 2008 & XXVII Panhellenic Historical Conference (Part II), 25–27 May 2007. Proceedings] (in Greek). Hellenic Historical Society. pp. 19–32.
- Malcolm, Noel (2015). Agents of Empire: Knights, Corsairs, Jesuits and Spies in the Sixteenth-century Mediterranean World. Oxford University Press. ISBN 978-0190262785.
- Tsiknakis, Kostas G. (2005). Επαναστατικές κινήσεις στη βορειοδυτική Πελοπόννησο στα τέλη του 16ου αιώνα [Revolutionary movements in the northwestern Peloponnese in the late 16th century] (in Greek). Dymi.
- Tsiknakis, Kostas (2013). "The Naval Battle of Nafpaktos and the Revolutionary Movements in Hellenic Area". Research Paper: The Battle of Lepanto and Its Impact on Europe. Venice: Greek Institute of Byzantine and Post-Byzantine Studies.
- Tsiknakis, Kostas (2022). "The Greeks and the Secret War among Venice, Spain and the Ottoman Empire" (PDF). Antologia Militare.
- Xhufi, Pëllumb (2019). "L'Adriatico orientale alla vigilia di Lepanto, 1570-1571" [The Eastern Adriatic on the Eve of Lepanto, 1570-1571]. In Persida Lazarević Di Giacomo; Maria Rita Leto (eds.). L'Adriatico tra sogno e realtà [The Adriatic Between Dream and Reality]. Studi interadriatici (in Italian). Vol. 1. Edizioni dell'Orso. pp. 41–64. ISBN 978-88-6274-936-7. ISSN 2612-5560.
- Yildirim, Onur (2007). "The Battle of Lepanto and Its Impact on Ottoman History and Historiography" (PDF). Mediterraneo in Armi (Secc. XV-XVIII). 2: 533–556. ISSN 1828-1818.
