= Emmanuel Mormoris =

Cretan military commander and notable political figure

Emmanuel Mormoris, Manolis Mormoris (Greek: Εμμανουήλ Μορμόρης) or Manoli Mormori (Albanian: Manol Mormori; Venetian: Manoli Mormori) was a 16th-century Cretan military commander and notable political figure in the Republic of Venice. He was the military commander of an Anti-Ottoman revolt at the time of the Ottoman-Venetian War of 1570-1573.

== Family and early years ==
The Mormori (or Murmuri) family originated from Nauplion, southern Greece. Emmanuel Mormoris has been described as of Greek or Albanian origin. In the 15th century Emmanuel Mormori is mentioned, a rich landlord in Nauplion who was married to a lady from the Bua family. With the capture of the Peloponnese by the Ottoman armies (late 15th-early 16th century) thousands of Greek refugees followed the Venetians. As such after the Ottoman conquest of Nauplion (1540) a branch of the Mormoris family escaped to the Venetian-controlled island of Crete. Various members of the family participated in the armed struggles against the Ottoman Empire. The named is mentioned in the sixteenth century either as Mormori or as Murmuri and it appears that the family was active at Nauplion, where it originate. The following period various members of the Greek-Cretan branch of the family served the Venetian Republic. In various contemporary reports Mormoris himself frequently praises the Greeks as well as various members of his family in their struggles against the Ottoman Empire.

The father of Emmanuel Mormoris, Jacomo, was a cavaliere in the Venetian army and commander of the Stratioti units of Crete. Shortly before 1570 Emmanuel Mormoris was sent by the Venetian provveditore generale (governor-general) of Crete to Sfakia, a region in western Crete, to convince some local rebel to submit to Venetian rule. At 1568 he became leader of a cavalry unit of stratioti di nationi Greca. At 1568 he was dispatched to Corfu. The following year he was accepted as member of the Cretan nobility (cretensi nobili) by the Venetian Senate.

== Activity in Epirus ==
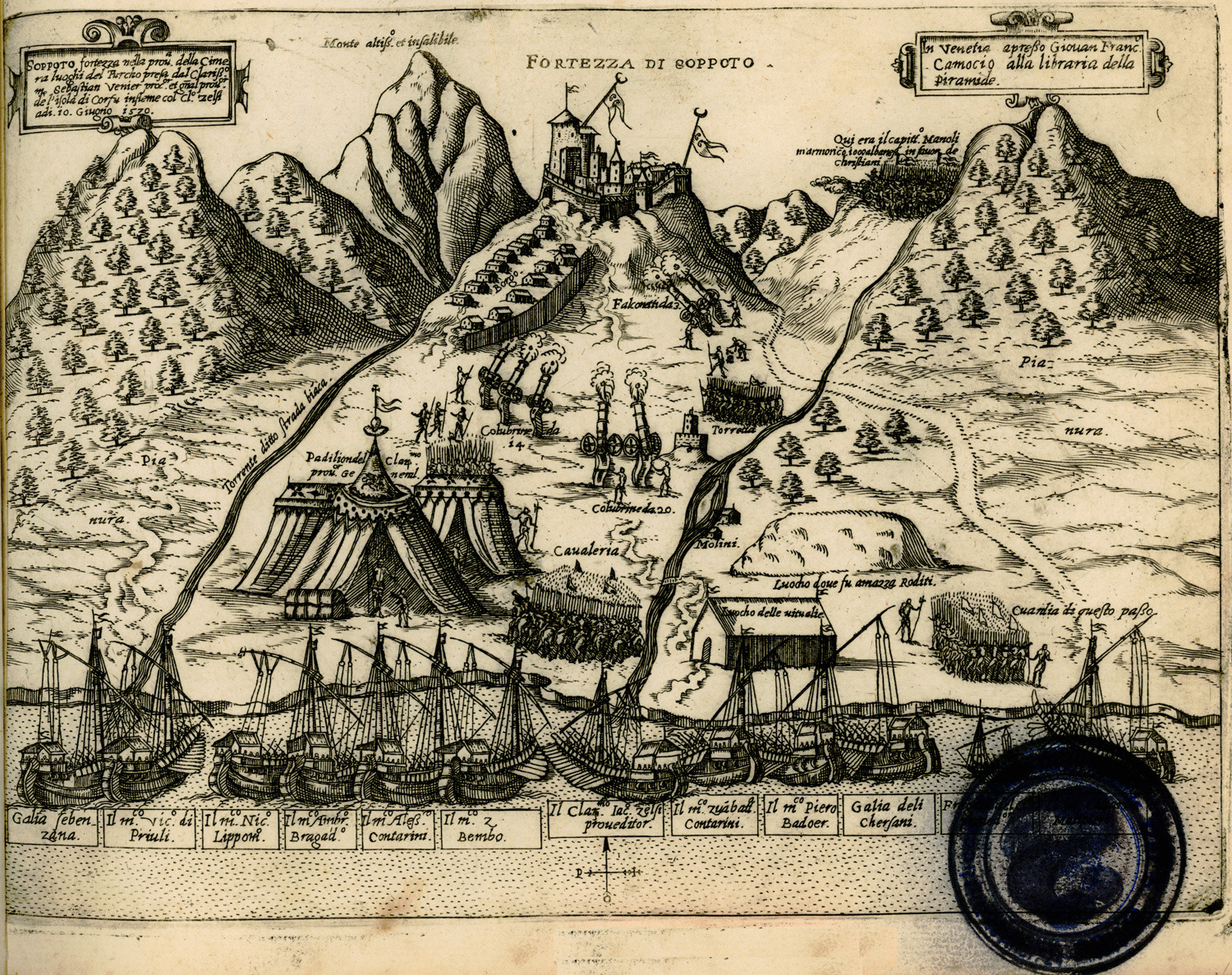
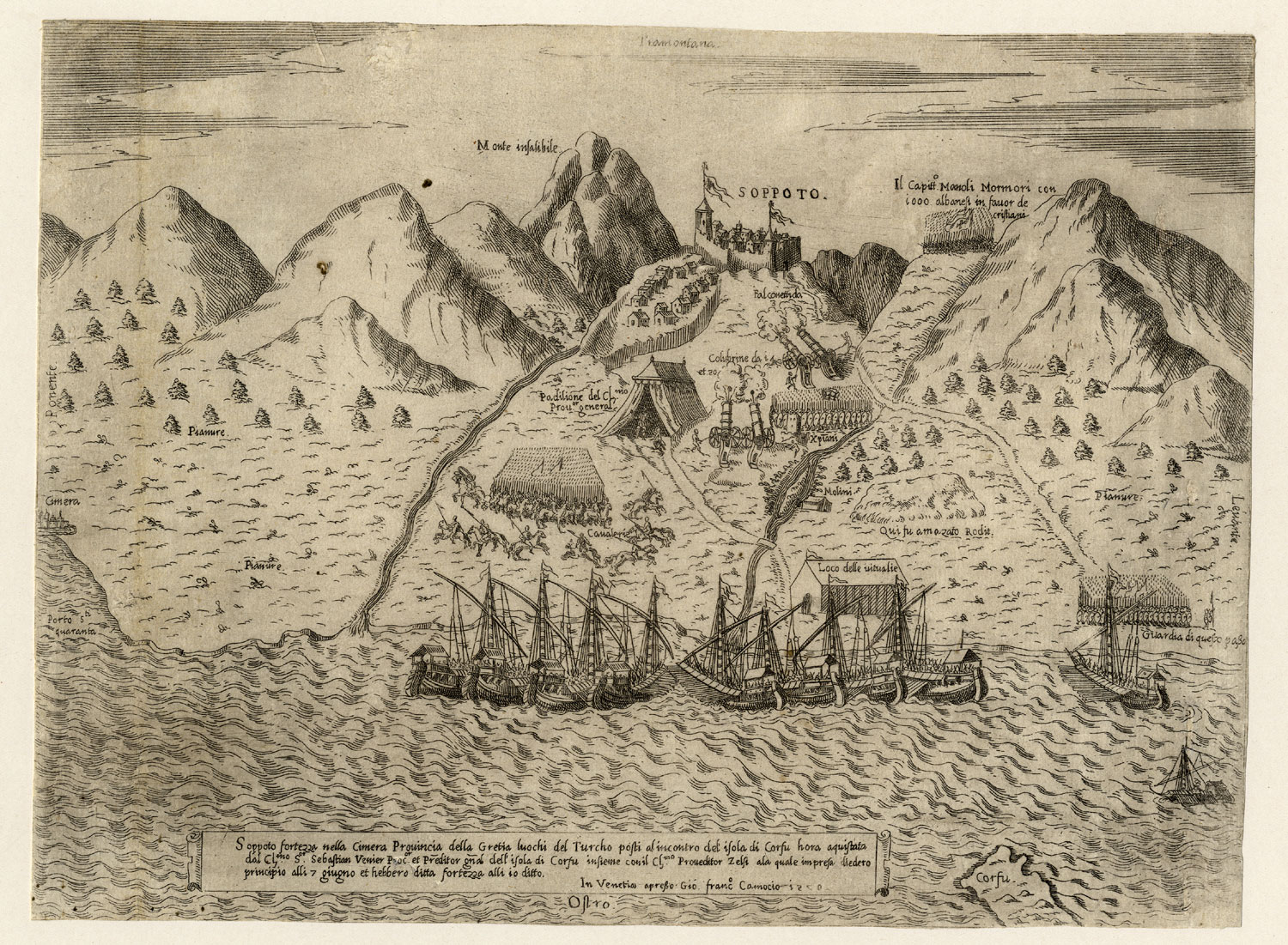
Drawings of the Sopot fortress in 1570 during capture by Venetian ships. Manoli Mormori (Emmanuel Mormoris) described in the legend being located in Soppoto of Himara in Greece"... "with 1000 Albanians having captured one of the surrounding hills in favor of Christians."

During the Ottoman-Venetian War of 1570-1573 Mormoris took action in the region of Epirus. As part of the revolutionary preparations the provveditore of Corfu, Sebastiano Venier, provided arms and ammunition to the Greeks of Himara. As soon as military operations began, Mormoris proposed the capture of the coastal fortress of Sopot across Corfu.

Sopot was the most important stronghold in the region. Based on contemporary accounts, the Greek groups that participated in the operations composed of units of Greek Stratioti from Corfu as well as Himariotes. After a successful siege on June 7, 1570, Mormoris was appointed commander of the fortress and the surrounding region. The capture of this strategic location triggered a general revolt under his leadership. Following this event the Ottoman presence was limited in the region to a few military outposts. As such Mormoris together with groups of Himariotes attempted to advance to neutralize them as soon as possible. Soon after the anti-Ottoman movement was spread to the adjacent regions of Argyrokastron (modern Gjirokastër), Delvina and Parga with the military guidance of the local Greek nobility and a number of Stratioti, such as Petros Lantzas and Georgios Renesis. In addition, the inhabitants of nearby Himara also supported the uprising and submitted voluntarily to Venetian rule, while making use of the advantageous mountainous terrain of their homeland.

Mormoris with a force composed of his soldiers and a 'large number of Albanians' proceeded to siege of the coastal fortress of Nivice. After operations lasting a year, it was finally taken in spring 1571. However, the rebels met difficulties during the siege of nearby Nivice which lasted nearly one year due to lack of the necessary preparations and artillery support. The capture of Nivica fort was achieved due to the military activities of the Himariotes and Mormoris. Meanwhile an Ottoman fleet under admiral Uluz Ali approached the coast of Himara. During the military operations Mormoris was assisted by his brother Zorzis Mormoris, who commanded units of Stratioti in Margariti, Santa Maura (Lefkada), and Corfu.

However, due to the developments of the ongoing Ottoman-Venetian War, Venice withdrew its support to the rebels. Thus, during the Ottoman counter-offensive the revolutionaries had to lift the siege of Kardhiq. Sopot was recaptured by the Ottomans at the same year (1571). Emmanuel Mormoris was captured during the Ottoman advance and taken prisoner to Constantinople. He was released in June 1575 during a prisoner exchange between the Venetian and Ottoman authorities.

== Later activity ==
At 1583 Mormoris, already promoted to colonel, was placed in command of the Venetian infantry units in Crete. He was involved in the construction of the new fortress and port at Rethymno. In 1590-1591 he was sent to Italy to suppress the revolt of the lord of Montemarciano, Alfonso Picollomini. The latter was executed in March 1591. The following year he returned to Crete to deal with various rebellions in the island. In the summer of 1593 he was placed in Kefallonia where he supervised the construction of the Venetian fortress in Asos. Mormoris was the author of several military reports on the subject of the construction of a wide network of fortifications in the Ionian islands and Crete.

== Sources ==
- Chasiotis, Ioannis (1970). Οι Ελληνες στις παραμονες της ναυμαχιας της Ναυπακτου: Eκκλησεις, Eπαναστατικες Kινησεις και Eξεγερσεις στην Ελληνικη Xερσονησο απο τις παραμονες ως το τελος του Κυπριακου πολεμου (1568-1571) (in Greek). Hetaireia Makedonikōn Spoudōn.
- Korre, Katerina (21–25 September 2016). Ο βίος και η πολιτεία της προσφυγικής οικογένειας Μούρμουρη (Mormori) στα Χανιά του 16ου αιώνα. Προσωπογραφία, οικογενειακές στρατηγικές, κοινωνικές συμπεριφορές. Heraklion: 12th International Congress of Cretan Studies (published 8 August 2019). ISBN 978-960-9480-35-2.
- Korre, Katerina (2018). Stradioti, mercenaries of Venice: military and social role (XV-XVI centuries) (Thesis) (in Greek). Ιόνιο Πανεπιστήμιο. Σχολή Ιστορίας και Μετάφρασης - Διερμηνείας. Τμήμα Ιστορίας. doi:10.12681/eadd/42539. hdl:10442/hedi/42539.
- Malcolm, Noel (2015). Agents of Empire: Knights, Corsairs, Jesuits and Spies in the Sixteenth-century Mediterranean World. Oxford University Press. ISBN 978-0190262785.
- Hatzopoulos, Dionysios (1993). "Greek Officers in the Eighteenth Century Venetian Army". The Journal of Modern Hellenism. 10: 157–165. ISSN 0743-7749.
