= Himara Revolt of 1596 =

1596 uprising against the Ottoman Empire

Himara Revolt
- Part of the Long War
Date	July–August 1596
Location	Himara, Albania, Ottoman Empire
Result	Ottoman victory

Belligerents
Himariots	Ottoman Empire

Commanders and leaders
Archbishop Athanasius	Unknown

Strength
1,300; 100 Spaniards	Unknown

Casualties and losses
Heavy	80 killed

The Himara Revolt of 1596 was an Albanian uprising organized by Archbishop Athanasius I of Ohrid in the region of Himara against the Ottoman Empire. It was part of a range of anti-Ottoman movements in the Western Balkans at the end of the 16th century during the Long Turkish War in the Balkans. The revolt received the support of various western powers and was instigated through local leaders, scholars and clergy as well as Greek military figures in their service.

== Background ==
Revolutionary action in Himara broke out again after Manthos Papagiannis' death in 1596.

Metropolitan bishop Athanasius I of Ohrid, an ethnic Greek who originated from Mani, was an influential personality in the area of his religious jurisdiction and took initiatives to stir up in revolt Albanians. The Himariotes considered him a saint and showed him full loyalty. Himara was among the Greek inhabited regions where revolutionary activity was mainly reported during this period (1571-1621).

Due to the Ottoman-Venetian peace treaty sign at 1573 various uprisings in the Balkans and especially in Epirus received encouragement by Spain and the Holy Roman Empire. As such Athanasius' attempt received the support of the local nobility, scholars, clerics as well as from Greek military figures under the command of western powers. Spanish conspirators decided to invite Athanasius I of Ohrid into their plans. He was described as "discrete and intelligent". In the beginning, Athanasius was uninvolved, until the beginning of 1596 when he offered his cooperation to the Venetian official in Corfu.

Athanasius sent a letter to the provveditore and captain of Corfu, Angelo Basadonna, in January 1596, about wanting to meet up and discuss "very important things". The two had a meeting on 26 January 1596, during which Athanasius spoke of the "miserable state of Christians" and asked for help for a general uprising to end Ottoman rule. Rejected by Venice, he openly joined the Spanish conspirators, who contacted the Neapolitan deputy about this. Athanasius sent his minister to Naples to ask for weapons and 2,000 soldiers from Spain, and to establish the whole plan of the uprising. He also sent a certain Paniperis, close associate and representative of Himara, to Neaples. The Neapolitan vice-king, the Count of Olivares, sent one of his captains, the Albanian stratiot Miguel Bua, to oversee the coastal fortresses of Bari and Otranto, as well as the events that were occurring in Himara, and to get to know the real intents of the people. While the Neapolitan captain was in Albania, the Himariots south of Vlorë immediately rose up. Bua brought ammunition and equipment for the insurgent inhabitants of Himara, and served as the captain and colonel of 2,000 Albanians.

Meanwhile, the Venetian ambassador in Naples suspected that the Himariotes received weapons from the Spanish and that they immediately sold them to the Ottomans. He also accused Petros Lantzas, a Greek agent that worked for the Spanish, for having organized this. Nevertheless those weapons were finally confiscated and sent back to Otranto.

The Albanian revolt of Himara was part of a range of anti-Ottoman movements in the Western Balkans at the end of the 16th century during the Long Turkish War in areas that extended from Epirus up north to the area of Šibenik (in Croatia).

== Uprising ==
Following Athanasius' promise to raise 6,000 Albanians and his plea for help in munitions, the Spaniards began preparations to attack. Athanasius had returned to Albania by the summer of 1596 and stayed in Himara. A contemporary source stated that there were 10,000 fighters in red costumes in Himara.

The revolt was active in July and August, with initial success, the rebels managing to control the coastal towns. Athanasius attacked the fortress of Kanina with the support of Ottaviano di Loffredo. A number of Greek and Albanian captains in the service of the Spanish in Naples also participated in this operation, such as Miguel Bua, Giovanni Golemi, Esteban Bublia, Nicodemos Konstantinos, etc.

The rebel force being reinforced by a small unit of Spaniards attacked the nearby Ottoman fort of Cerna. The fort was simultaneously attacked from three directions by 1,300 men, of whom only 300 were equipped with arquebuses. Initially a group of 100 Spaniards managed to capture part of the fort raising their flag, killing 80 Ottoman soldiers including the commander of the fort. During the attack Nicodemos Konstantinos was wounded by an arquebus on the right arm while his brother Simon was taken prisoner by the Ottomans. However the Himariots being confused about this turn of the battle withdrew from the battlefield. Meanwhile a part of the soldiers engaged in looting and fled with their loot to the mountains. Ottaviano had to defend the fort with just 50 men, but finally had to withdraw without dismantling it, as had been foreseen in his initial plan. This gave the opportunity to the Ottomans to launch a successful counterattack.

The revolt was easily suppressed after the Venetians convinced some of the chieftains not to join the rebellion, and the fact that the rebel army was undisciplined.

== Aftermath ==
After the unsuccessful operation Athanasius returned to Himara for the preparations of another rebellion. The remaining Spaniards left the region, but Athanasius awaited this time an aid of 3–4,000 soldiers from the Spanish king. Simon Konstantinos being taken prisoner was sent to Constantinople and his property was confiscated. However, due to his noble origin he wasn't executed. On August 23, 1596 he met with the Albanian captains Michael Bua, Giovanni Golemi, and Michael Papada. They each received a monthly pay of 50 ducats. They then went to Lecce to arm the Himariots with 1,000 arquebuses, powder, lead, four drums, and four royal banners (insegne del Re). Athanasius then moved to Rome and had an audience with the Pope. The following 20 years he continued to visit various western European leaders to trigger their intervention against the Ottomans, but without success. Lantzas was one of the main supporters of the Himariotes while Jeronimo Combi, an Albanian stratioti captain who also served as agent for the Spanish, was against them. Combi also discouraged Michael Bua and his companions.

In the Sanjak of Herzegovina and Montenegro Vilayet, the Serbs rose up in 1596–97, but without foreign support the rebels were forced to capitulate. In 1600, a rebellion broke out in Thessaly.

== Sources ==
- Bartl, Peter (1974). Der Westbalkan zwischen spanischer Monarchie und osmanischem Reich: zur Türkenkriegsproblematik an der Wende vom 16. zum 17. In Kommission bei Otto Harrasowitz. ISBN 978-3-447-01553-0.
- Campana, Cesare (1597). Delle historie del mondo, descritte dal sig. Cesare Campana, gentil'huomo aquilano. Volume primo [-secondo]. ..: Volume secondo che contiene libri sedici. Ne' quali diffusamente si narrano le cose auuenute dall'anno 1580 fino al 1596. Con vn discorso intorno allo scriuere historie. appresso Giorgio Angelieri, & compagni. pp. 579–. (Primary)
- Filološki fakultet (1979). Прилози за књижевност, језик, историју и фолклор. Vol. 45–52. Државна штампарија Краљевине Срба, Хрвата и Словенаца. p. 157.
- Floristan, J. M. (2018). "Contactos diplomáticos de Himarë con el Reino de Nápoles en el siglo xvi: embajadas y embajadore". Studia Albanica (in Spanish). 55 (1): 141–172. ISSN 0585-5047.
- Floristán, José M. (2019). "Stradioti albanesi al servizio degli Asburgo di Spagna (I): le famiglie albanesi Bua, Crescia e Renesi". Shêjzat – Pleiades (1–2).
- Hasiotis, Ioannis (1970). Οι Έλληνες στις παραμονές της ναυμαχίας της Ναυπάκτου: Εκκλήσεις, επαναστατικές κινήσεις και εξεγέρσεις στην Ελληνική χερσόνησο απο τις παραμονές ως το τέλος του Κυπριακού πολέμου (1568-1571) [The Greeks on the Eve of the Battle of Lepanto: Appeals, Revolutionary Movements and Uprisings in the Greek Peninsula from the Eve until the End of the War of Cyprus (1568-1571)] (in Greek). Thessaloniki: Society for Macedonian Studies.
- Kontali, Athina (2011). The Participation of the Greek Orthodox Clergy in the Uprising Movements against the Turkish Conquest: 1453-1821. ΕΝΝΟΙΑ. pp. 126–127. doi:10.12681/eadd/26884. hdl:10442/hedi/26884. ISBN 9789606410260.
- Matkovski, Aleksandar (1983). Otpor na Makedonija vo vremeto na turskoto vladeenje. Vol. 4. Misla. p. 228.
- Randa, Alexander (1964). Pro Republica Christiana: Die Walachei im "Langen" Türkenkrieg der Katholischen Universalmächte (593-1606). Fremdsprachendruckerei P. Belej. p. 130.
- SANU (1932). Posebna izdanja. Vol. 93. SANU. p. 131.
- East European Quarterly. Vol. 10. University of Colorado. 1976. pp. 118–119.
- Vakalopoulos, Konstantinos A. (2003). History of Epirus: From the Beginning of Ottoman Rule to Modern Times [History of Epirus: From the Start of Ottoman Rule to the Present Day] (in Greek). Herodotos. ISBN 9789607290977.
- Vranousis, L.; Sfyroeras, V. (1997). "From the Turkish Conquest to the Beginning of the Nineteenth Century: Revolutionary Movements and Uprisings". Epirus, 4000 Years of Greek History and Civilization: 244–251. ISBN 9789602133712.
- Xhufi, Pellumb (2016). "Shqiptarët në Korfuz dhe rasti i familjes Lanza". Studime Historike. LXX (LII) (1–2). Academy of Sciences of Albania - Center of Albanological Studies.
