= Myrtos Gulf =

Gulf of the Ionian Sea

Coordinates: 38.35°N 20.5°E

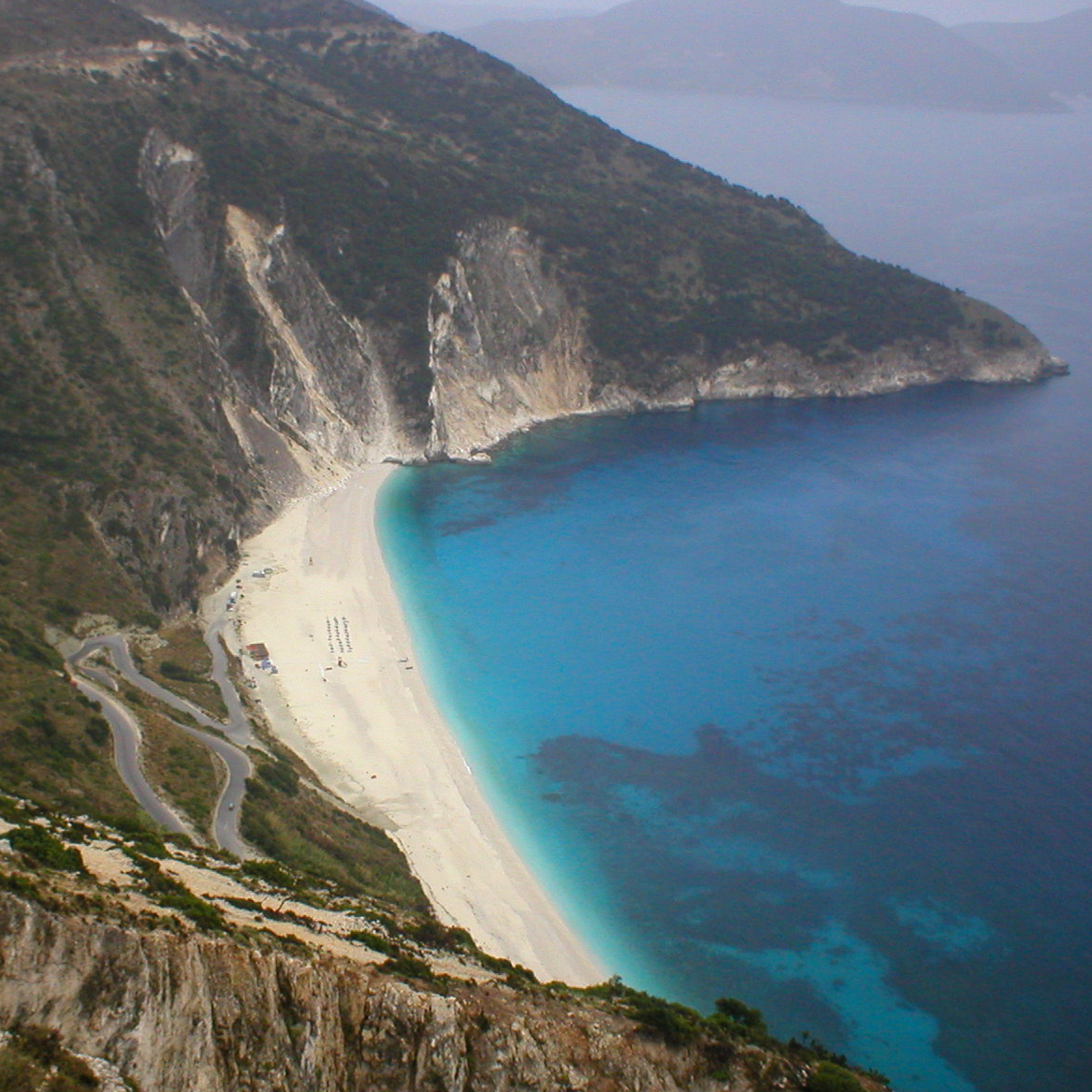
View from the street to the beach.

The Myrtos Gulf (Greek: Κόλπος Μύρτου Kolpos Myrtou) is a gulf on the north coast of the island Cephalonia, Greece. It is a bay of the Ionian Sea.

The main villages on its shore are Asos and Zola. The total length is approximately 10 km long and is approximately 10 km wide. It stretches from Cape Kakata to Asos from east to west and from Zola to the Asos Peninsula to the north. The gulf has a mountainous coast. There are no ferry routes in this gulf.
