= Petros Lantzas =

Petros Lantzas Pietro Lanza/Pedro Lanza
- Born: c. 1533; Corfu
- Died: 26 February 1613; Naples
- Occupations: Rebel, spy, privateer and pirate
- Known for: Various plots to overthrow Ottoman rule in Greek-inhabited regions
- Parent: Giorgio Lanza
- Awards: Sopracomito / Governor of Parga
- Espionage activity
- Country: Greece
- Allegiance: Republic of Venice; Spanish Empire

Petros Lantzas (Greek: Πέτρος Λάντζας; Italian: Pietro Lanza or Spanish: Pedro Lanza; c. 1533 – 26 February 1613), was a Corfiot Greek, spy, privateer and pirate in the 16th century Balkans who took part in several anti-Ottoman plots. He initially worked for the Republic of Venice and from 1574 was employed by the Spanish Empire. Lantzas was involved in various plots to overthrow Ottoman rule in Greek-inhabited regions. In 1608, he devised a plan to assassinate the Ottoman sultan Ahmed I by placing a present containing explosives in front of him.

== Early years ==
Petros Lantzas was born on the island of Corfu, then part of the Republic of Venice (now in modern Greece). The Lantza family originated from western Europe, but was already located in Corfu for some centuries according to local records found in the island. The Lanza before their settlement in Corfu were likely one of the Albanian artistocratic families near Butrint and they were allies of John Zenevisi in the late 14th century. They settled in Corfu after the Ottoman conquest in the 15th century. Russian historian Vladimir Lamansky noted in Venetian records comita Lanza who was an ally of Zenevisi in 1394 and had close relations with Venice. He must be the same as a certain Gjin (Ghin) Lanza who is listed among those Albanian noblemen who were considered to be allies by the Venetians. Murzaku (2009) has proposed that Pietro Lanza was a native of Himara.

Andrea Lanza, grandfather of Petros, was appointed at 1499 castellano and then at 1500 governor (capitano) of Parga. His father was a priest in Corfu. His son Georgios was also appointed governor of the same town at 1544-1545. An archival document contains a biographical note which mentions that Petro Lanza was in fact not a Lanza, but the illegitimate son of a Venetian commander, Captain General Benedetto da Pesaro. According to one view Lantzas/Lanza himself is described in contemporary sources as Greek. According to another view he is described variously; some described him as part of the local Greek Corfiot nobility, other avoid any characterization as part of the local Corfiot Greek population.

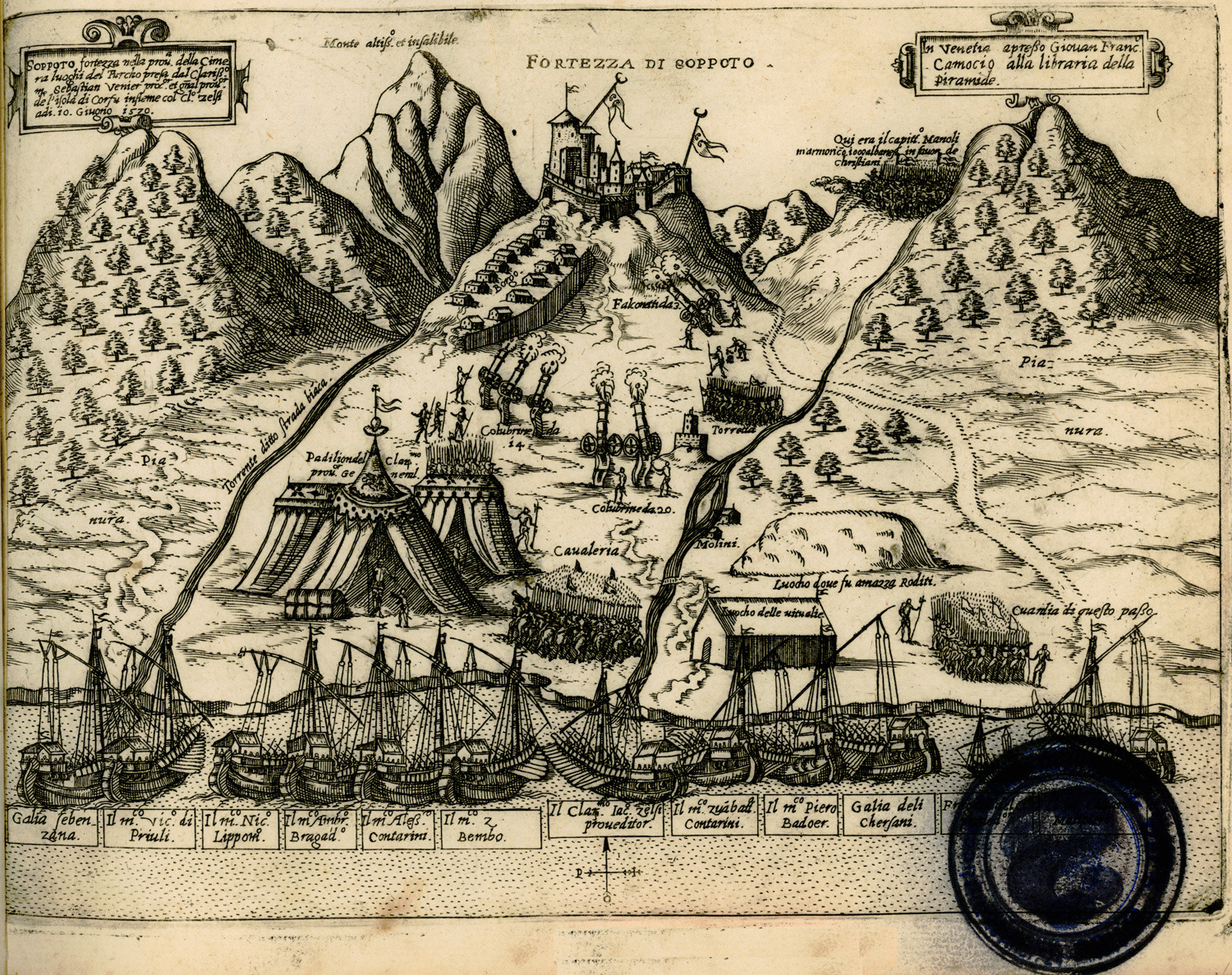
The Castle of Sopoto (today Borshi) besieged by the Venetians in 1570

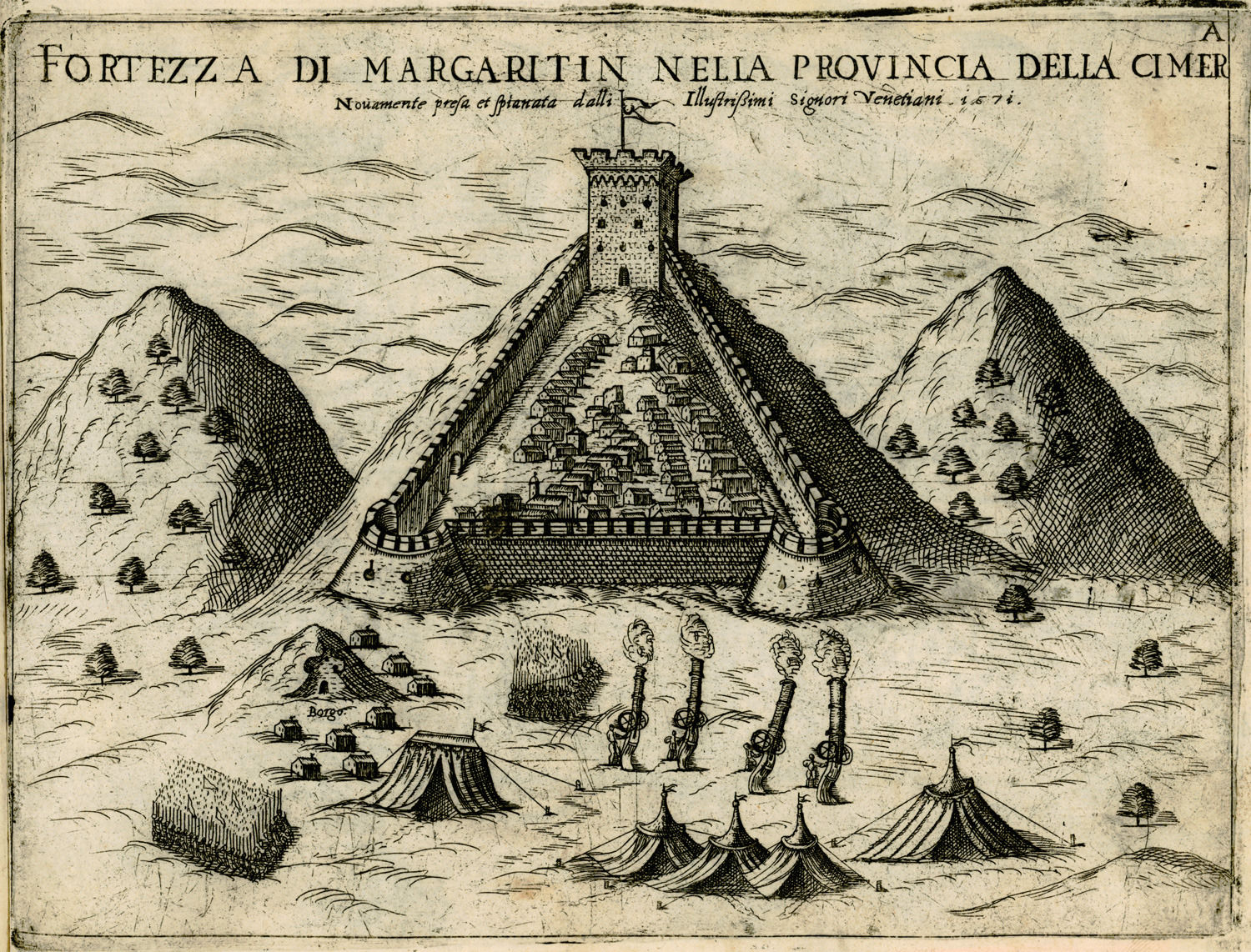
The castle of Margariti under Venetian siege (1571)

During the Ottoman-Venetian War of 1570-1573, he supported the rebellion of Emmanuel Mormoris in Ottoman-ruled Epirus. As such, Lantzas made preparatory skirmishes and raided Turkish ships in the regions of Lepanto and Preveza. He also attacked inland regions and penetrated as far as Delvinë. After the successful siege of Sopot (today Borsh) at 10 June 1570 he managed to continue his activities against the Ottomans with the support of the Greek element of Epirus. The next year at 22 November 1571 support the Venetians in the successful siege of Margariti castle. At the end of the war (1573), he was appointed governor of the coastal town of Parga, opposite of Corfu, by the Venetians.

In 1574, however, Lantzas was dismissed from office and banished by the Venetian authorities. Though the reason for this turn of events is unclear, an anonymous letter sent to the local Venetian provveditore (governor-general) alleged that Lantzas was ostensibly buying munitions from the Spanish to allow the locals to defend themselves against the Turks, but according to the letter he was in fact selling these munitions to the Turks for his own profit. The letter goes on to ask for Lantzas to be assassinated. Meanwhile, being unhappy with the Venetian–Ottoman peace settlement, he transferred to Spanish service. Lantzas served the Viceroy of Naples and became a notable member of the Greek community of Naples.

== In Spanish service ==
Venice decided to sue for a unilateral peace with the Ottomans in 1573. As a result, the Greek collaborators of the Venetians and their agents in Corfu and the Ottoman Empire turned to the Kingdom of Naples, then part of the Spanish Empire. On the other hand, Spain actively encouraged insurrections against the Ottoman Empire and acceded to the petitions of a number of rebels and potential rebels.

In the following years, Lantzas served the Spanish as a corsair and spy. In July 1576, he went to Himara, where the local population was willing to raise a revolt against Ottoman rule. As part of this, Lantzas, together with the rebels from Himara, led an attack against the nearby Ottoman fortress of Sopot (today Borsh), with success.

Lantzas' assignment was to supervise the military movements of the Ottomans, as well as those of the Venetians, and to direct the shipment of weapons, provisions, spies, and saboteurs who were sent repeatedly to Epirus, the Ottoman capital of Constantinople, and other parts of the Ottoman Empire. He led pirate raids against Ottoman ships, while from 1577 he began chasing and attacking Venetian ships (frigates and galliots) by orders of the governor of Bari and Otranto. These activity resulted in diplomatic tensions between Habsburg Spain and Venice. This activity aroused the wrath of Venice, which attempted to assassinate him. As a result of this activity, Lantzas was dismissed from his post as the captain of the royal frigates in 1578, though he continued to serve the Viceroys of Naples until the first decade of the 17th century.

In 1578, under the guidance of Lantzas, plans were proposed to the Viceroy of Naples and the Spanish king Philip II (r. 1556–1598) for a military intervention in favor of a Greek insurrection in Cyprus, which had been occupied by the Ottomans since 1571. In August 1596, Lantzas supported another revolt in Himara led by the Archbishop of Ohrid, Athanasios Rizeas.

Later, Lantzas proposed to engage in a number of clandestine operations by moving to Constantinople; in 1608, he devised a plan to assassinate the Ottoman sultan by placing a present containing explosives in front of him.

Lantzas died on 26 February 1613 during a trip to Ragusa on the Adriatic shore.
