= Assos Castle =

Venetian fortification in Kefalonia, Greece

- Κάστρο της Άσσου
- Assos, Cephalonia, Greece
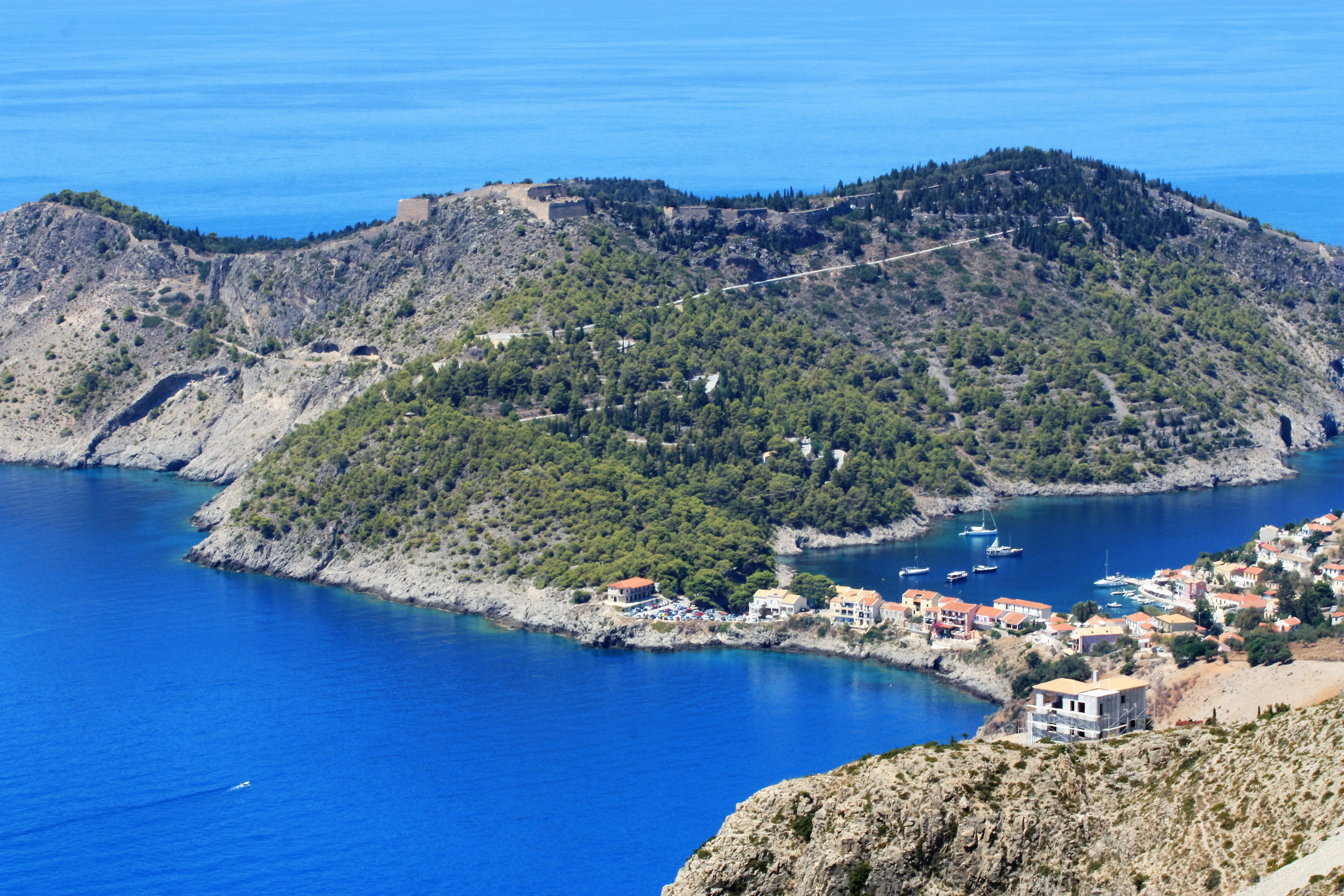
- View of the Assos Castle

Site information
- Type: citadel
- Owner: Hellenic Ministry of Culture
- Controlled by: Republic of Venice 1593–1797; Septinsular Republic 1799–1807; The Ionian Islands 1815–1864
- Open to the public: Yes
- Condition: Ruin

Location
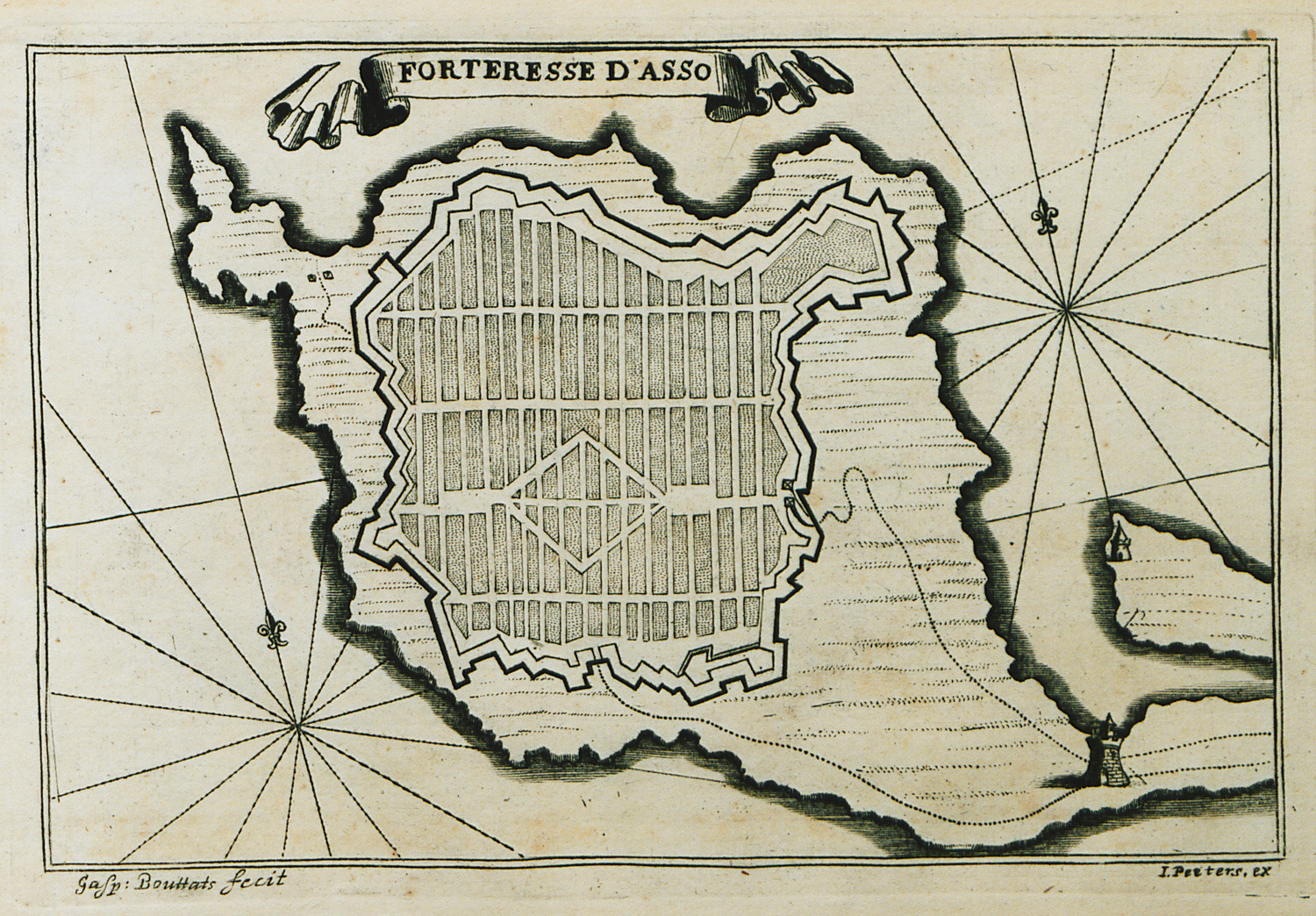
- 1690 plan of Assos castle, by Jacob Peeters
- 1690 plan of Assos castle, by Jacob Peeters
- Coordinates: 38°38′30″N 20°28′53.0″E

Site history
- Built: 1593
- Built by: Republic of Venice
- Architect: Marino Gentillini
- Materials: Limestone

The Assos Castle (Greek: Κάστρο της Άσσου, romanized: Kastro tis Assou) is a Venetian fortification on Kefalonia island in western Greece.

Together with St George's Castle, the castle of Assos is a fine example of military architecture of the island of Kefalonia—British general Charles James Napier described it as 'stronger than Gibraltar'—and one of its main tourist attractions. It overlooks the bay of Agia Kyriaki, north of Paliki, and could act as a base from which to defend the island, to protect against pirates as well as a naval invasion. The castle stands on the top of a 170m high rocky hill, which encompasses the entire peninsula of Assos. The castle is protected by a wall of 2000 meters length, and covers an area of 44,000 sq. meters.

== History ==
While Kefalonia was under Venetian rule in 1584, a petition by the nobles of Kefalonia was presented to the Venetian Senate for the creation of a new fortress, as the Castle of Saint George (the other castle of Kefalonia) could not defend the entire island against the Turkish threat and the pirate raids. At the time Venice had a plan for protecting territories in the east by founding a city within the castle and moving their administration there from St. George's. Building commenced in 1593 under the supervision of Ambrosius Cornelius (Ven. Ambroso Corner), as the sign outside the main gate shows. The castle was built by the Venetian architect Marino Gentillini, between 1593 and 1596. Gentillini eventually married and settled in Kefalonia, and his name was inscribed in the Libro d'Oro of noble families. His descendants today preserve the pioneering Gentillini winery.

Assos has always had a small population. Its location meant that under siege its supplies, including water, could be cut off. Still, the castle became the capital of northern Kefalonia as a large fort with a small settlement inside. In 1684, the Venetians took Lefkas from the Turks and the Assos castle lost its strategic importance. In 1757, with piracy and the Turkish threat reduced, the Venetians founded Argostoli, which became the main town of the island. Asos remained the seat of the Venetian provveditore until the Fall of the Republic of Venice and the end of Venetian rule in Kefalonia. In 1822, about 1700 people came from Souli to stay in the Assos fortress and the whole area became a quarantine area, resulting in a settlement within the fortress named Souli. For the next century, Assos continued to be a fortress without a military role. In the late 1920s, a prison was started there which after World War II hosted political prisoners, who kept vineyards and crops of cereal. The Ionian Islands were badly damaged by the Ionian Earthquake in 1953. After that, most people of the castle left and the prison was closed. The 1961 census found only 6 people living in the fortress, the last of whom left in 1963. They had been known as the "Kastrinoi" ("people of the castle"), comprising large families who mainly cultivated olives and grapes.

== Access ==
Today the castle is open daily with no entry fee. Access to the castle is by a renovated stone path. Parts of the walls and an arched entrance gate with the Venetian Lion of Saint Mark are the mainly preserved sections. Visitors can see within the ruins the small church of St. Mark and the house of the Venetian High Commissioner. Close to the castle is the small, abandoned, church of the Prophet Elias which was built in 1888 on the ruins of another small church dating from 1500. Near the church are the ruins of a Venetian building owned by the Gentilini family.
