= Athanasius I of Ohrid =

Archbishop of Ohrid from 1596 to 1598

Athanasius I (1560–1616) was the Archbishop of Ohrid from 1596 to 1598. He was known for protecting the Slavs in the region of Macedonia from Ottoman tyranny. Athanasius was a Greek, born in the Mani Peninsula in southern Greece, as Athanasios Rizeas (Greek: Αθανάσιος Ριζέας). He organized the failed Himara Revolt against the Ottoman Empire.

== 1596–97 ==
In 1596 Athanasius sought to end Ottoman rule and contacted the Venetians, meeting with Angelo Basadonna, the provveditore of Corfu, in Butrint. The Venetians refused to help, but Spain supported the revolt. In 1596, a source stated that there were 10,000 fighters in red costumes in Himara. As he did not receive the aid he asked for, he travelled to Naples, where he was unsuccessful as well. He then visited the Pope in Rome, where he asked for aid in the organization of an uprising in Macedonia.

Athanasius went back to Albania in the summer of 1596, and stayed in Himara. On August 23, 1596 he met with Albanian captains Michael Bua, Giovanni Golemi and Michael Papada with the purpose to organize a revolt. They each received a monthly pay of 50 ducats.

== Sources ==
- Griechischer Biographischer Index [Greek Biographical Index]. Walter de Gruyter. 2003. p. 112. ISBN 978-3-11-095002-1.

Religious titles
Preceded by Joachim	Archbishop of Ohrid; 1596—1598	Succeeded by Varlaam
