= Asos =

Village on Cephalonia, Ionian Islands, Greece

Asos Άσος
- Community
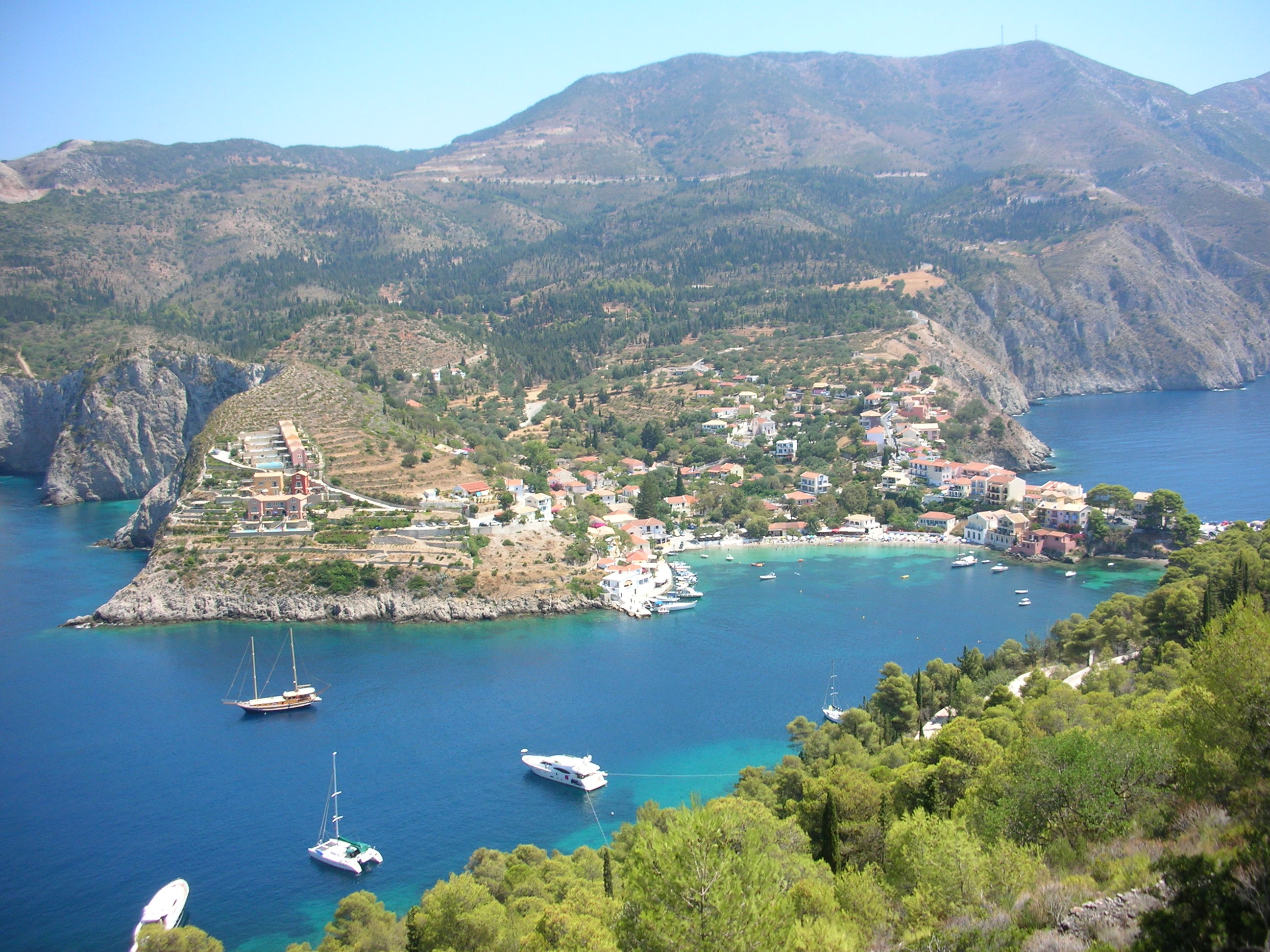
- Asos as seen from the Assos Castle peninsula

- Location within Greece
- Coordinates: 38°23′N 20°33′E
- Country: Greece
- Administrative region: Ionian Islands
- Regional unit: Cephalonia
- Municipality: Sami
- Municipal unit: Erisos

Population (2021)
  - Community: 61
- Time zone: UTC+2 (EET)
  - Summer (DST): UTC+3 (EEST)

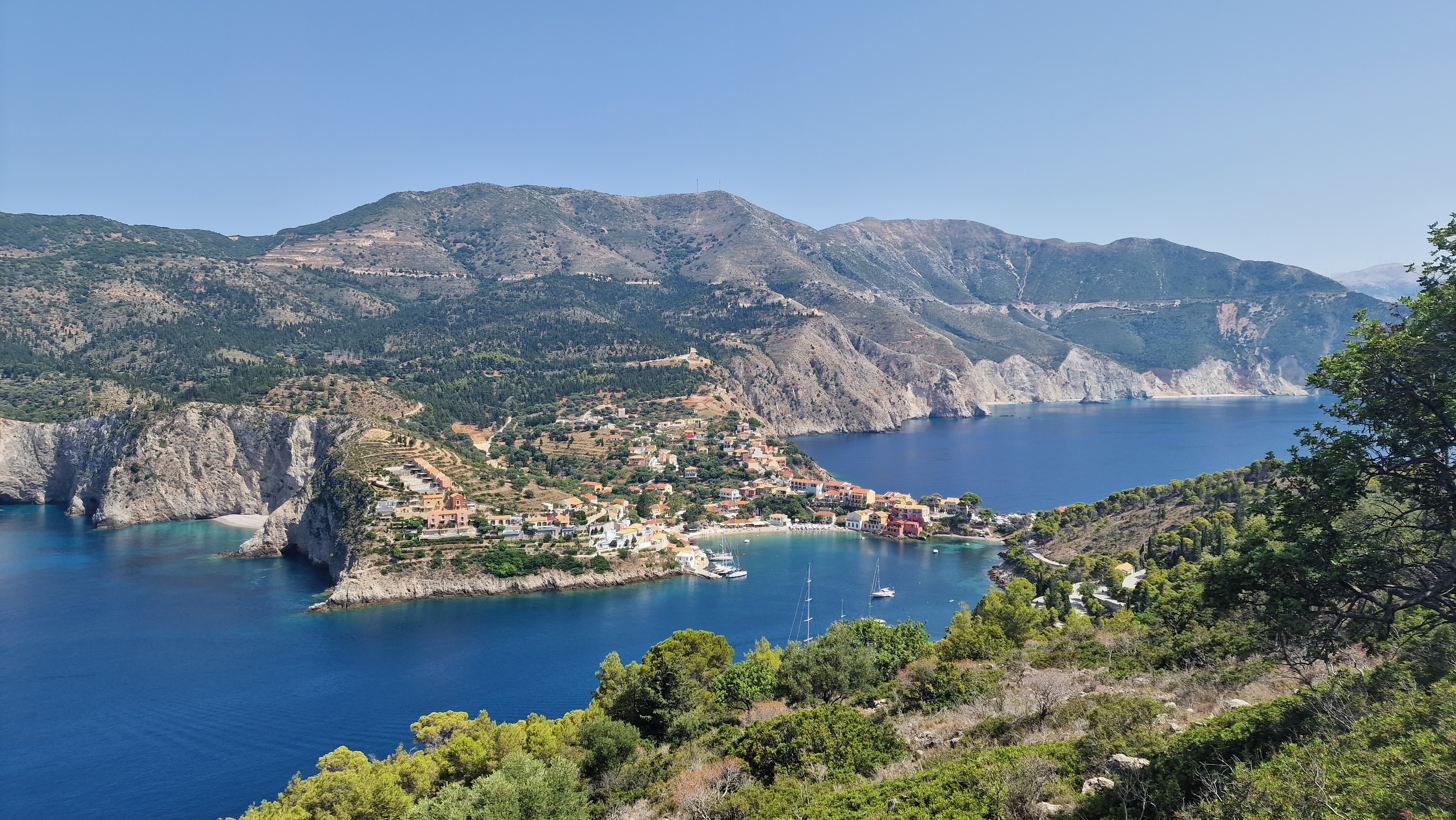
Assos village on the northwest coast of Kefalonia, Greece

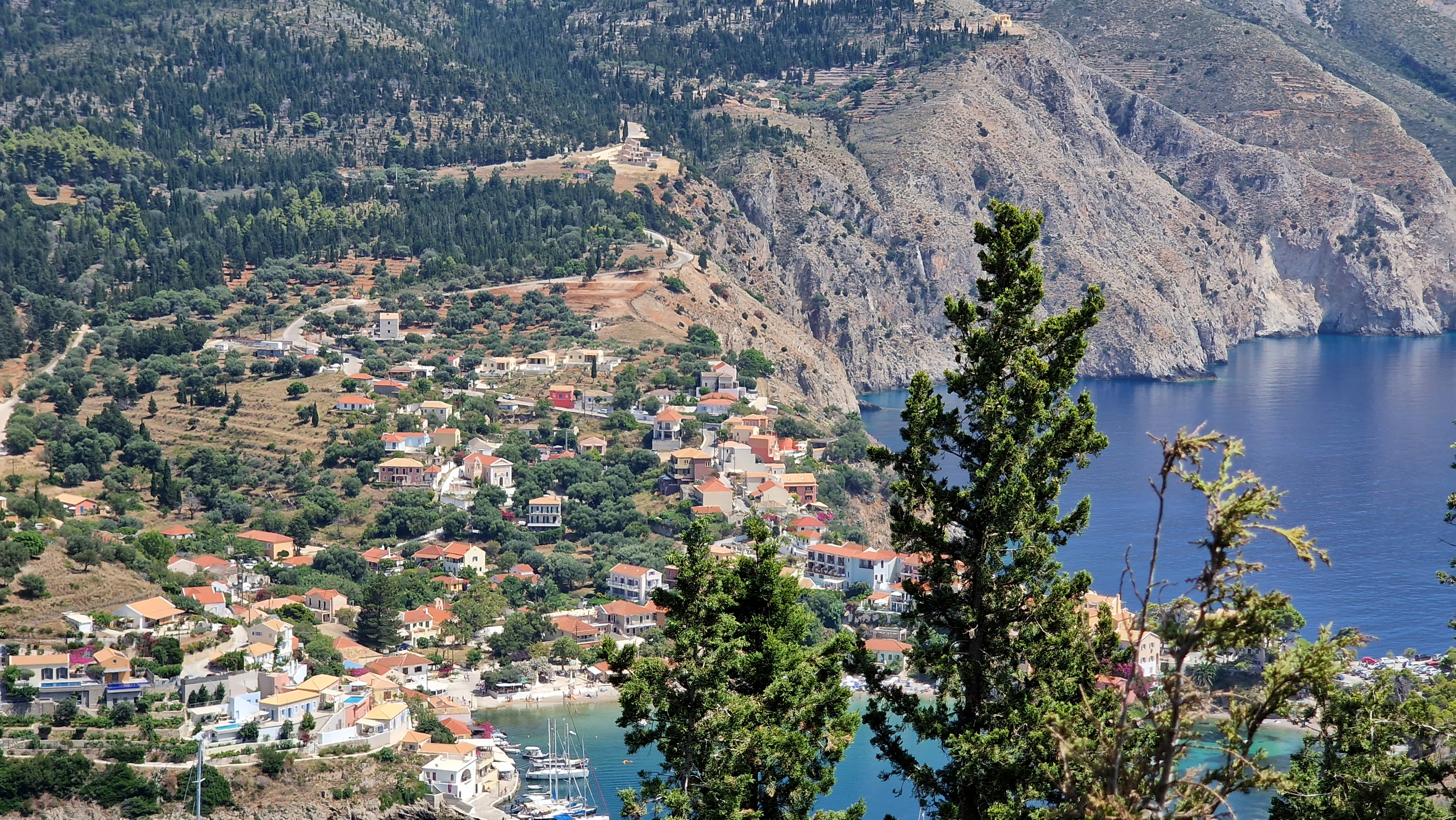
Assos village on the northwest coast of Kefalonia, Greece

Asos (Greek: Άσος) is a village on the west coast of the island of Cephalonia, Greece and is located 36km north of Argostoli. It is part of the municipal unit Erisos.

Asos was founded under Venetian rule and it served as the administrative capital of northern Cephalonia from 1593 onwards. Marino Gentilini, an Italian army engineer, was commissioned by the Venetian Senate in 1593-1595 to build the Assos Castle, one of the largest in Greece. The castle was initially built with the view that it would protect local populations in case of an invading attack by passing Turks or pirates, but for various reasons, such as the lack of natural springs for water supply, it was never adopted as a fortress and gradually the grand plan was dropped.
