= Manthos Papagiannis =

Greek noble

- Native name: Μάνθος or Ματθαίος Παπαγιάννης
- Born: Ergiri, Epirus region, Ottoman Empire
- Died: Between 1580 and 1596
- Occupation: Noble and revolutionary

Manthos or Matthaios Papagiannis (Greek: Μάνθος or Ματθαίος Παπαγιάννης, ? – died between 1580 and 1596) was a Greek noble and revolutionary. He was involved in various plots to overthrow Ottoman rule in the northern regions of Epirus. For many years, Papagiannis attempted to convince various rulers of Western Europe to lend him military support for an uprising against the Ottoman Empire.

== Early life ==
Papagiannis was born in Gjirokastër (modern southern Albania), Epirus region, Ottoman Empire to a local Greek family. He was one of the representatives of the town's Greek community. Papagiannis was one of the most active merchants in his homeland as well as in the nearby Venetian possessions on the Ionian coast.

== Plans to trigger Western intervention ==
Papagiannis organized a rebellion against Ottoman rule after the Battle of Lepanto (1571), where the Ottoman fleet was defeated by the Holy League. He initiated correspondence with various Western European rulers, where he propagated that his compatriots were eager to cast off Ottoman rule. He also claimed that a victory could be easily achieved with the creation of an anti-Ottoman alliance with the local Greek subjects. In 1572, after securing the support of various local Orthodox metropolitan bishops, especially Joachim of Ohrid, he moved to Venice. There he negotiated with Doge Sebastiano Venier for the possibility of Venetian involvement in the revolt. In February–April 1572, a Venetian fleet of twelve galleys was ready to attack the coastal region of Delvine. However, Venier recalled the attack order, in fear that his manpower was not enough for a successful assault. The Venetian activity was limited to a minor raid against the coastal village of Mazaraki on the Ionian coast. Nevertheless, Venice ultimately decided to make peace with the Ottomans and Papagiannis's proposals were dismissed.

The following year, Papagiannis, together with another local noble from Argyrocastro, Panos Kestolikos, moved to Naples and asked the Spaniards to support their revolutionary plan. They also discussed the possibility of an anti-Ottoman armed struggle with the head of the Holy League, John of Austria, "as Greek representatives of enslaved Greece and Albania". John was eager to provide the necessary support for an immediate revolt, but the Spanish dismissed the plans. They provided only a limited amount of money to Papagiannis in exchange for remaining in their service as an agent.

After the dissolution of the Holy League, both Papagiannis and Kestolikos approached Philip II of Spain (r. 1554–1558). In 1574, Papagiannis was in Ottoman-controlled Epirus to prepare another planned revolt. The following year, he was located in Himara, on the Ionian coast, together with Basque spy Antonio de Echavarri, in order to determine if the situation was ripe for that purpose. Later, in 1577, he established contacts with Spanish spy Martin de Acuna in Constantinople.

== Later life ==
After several unsuccessful attempts to trigger Western intervention against the Ottoman Empire and agitating for the liberation of the northern part of Epirus, Papagiannis's plans were exposed to the Ottomans. He escaped to Western Europe, but his property was confiscated by the Ottoman authorities and his wife and children were arrested and jailed. The local rural communities were also subjected to Ottoman punishment, even those that were not involved with the preparations.

Papagiannis died between 1580 and 1596. His daughter, Argyro, moved to Venice where she received a monthly allowance from the Venetian Republic. The subsequent revolt of Himara brought another wave of anti-Ottoman activity in 1596.
