= World War I memorials =

Commemorative sites

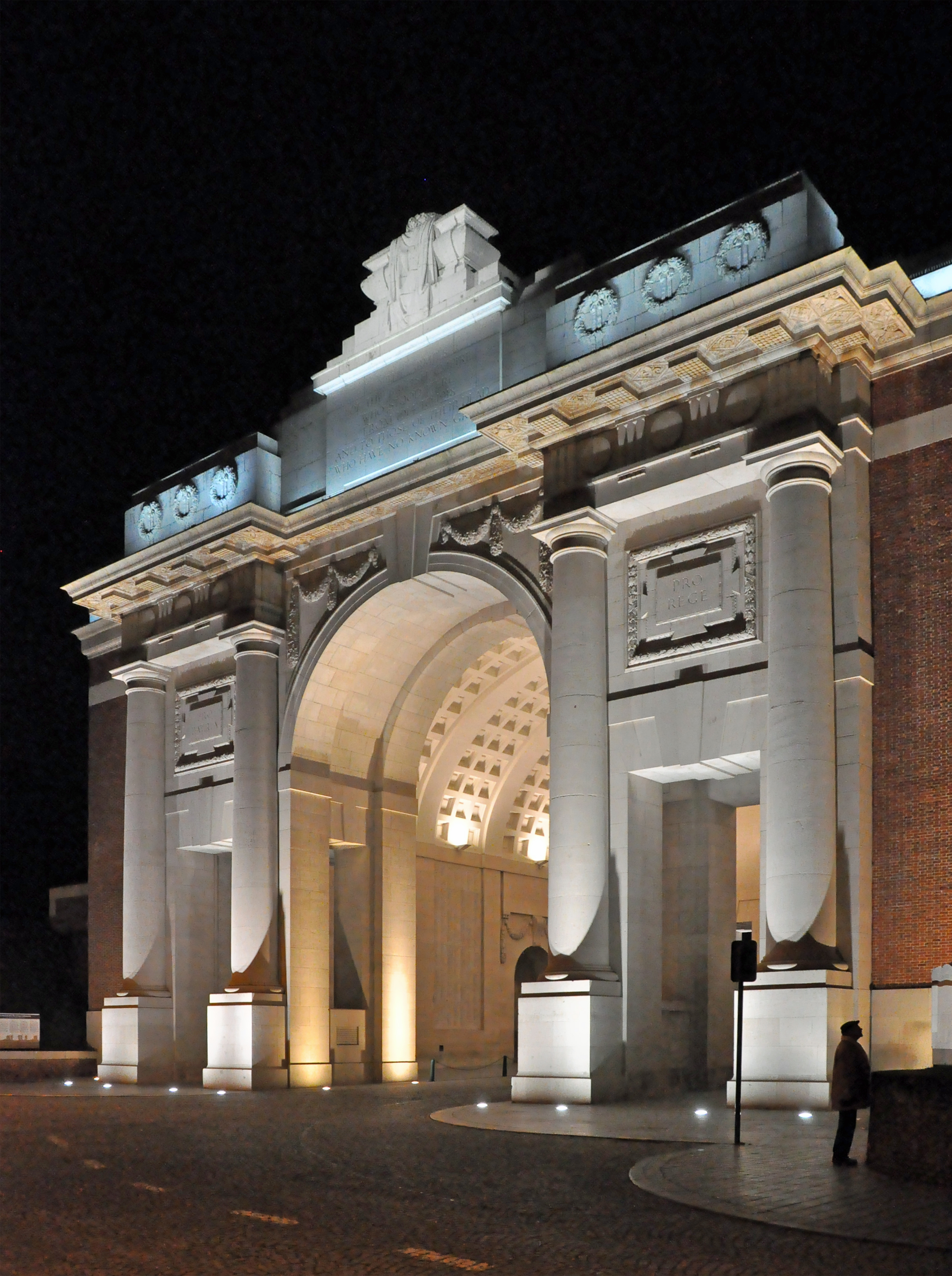
The classically inspired Menin Gate in Ypres

World War I is remembered and commemorated by various war memorials, including civic memorials, larger national monuments, war cemeteries, private memorials and a range of utilitarian designs such as halls and parks, dedicated to remembering those involved in the conflict. Huge numbers of memorials were built in the 1920s and 1930s, with around 176,000 erected in France alone. This was a new social phenomenon and marked a major cultural shift in how nations commemorated conflicts. Interest in World War I and its memorials faded after World War II, and did not increase again until the 1980s and 1990s, which saw the renovation of many existing memorials and the opening of new sites. Visitor numbers at many memorials increased significantly, while major national and civic memorials continue to be used for annual ceremonies remembering the war.

Architecturally, most war memorials were relatively conservative in design, aiming to use established styles to produce a tragic but comforting, noble and enduring commemoration of the war dead. Classical themes were particularly common, taking the prevailing styles of the late 19th century and typically simplifying them to produce cleaner, more abstract memorials. Allegorical and symbolic features, frequently drawing on Christian imagery, were used to communicate themes of self-sacrifice, victory and death. Some memorials adopted a medievalist theme instead, looking backwards to a more secure past, while others used emerging realist and Art Deco architectural styles to communicate the themes of the war.

The establishment of memorials was overseen by various national and regional bodies, reflecting diverse political landscapes. Funding sources were similarly varied, often relying on local donations to finance construction expenses. However, state authorities typically centrally managed and funded war cemeteries and memorials commemorating pivotal battles. The war encouraged the creation of new forms of memorial. Lists of memorial names, reflecting the huge scale of the losses, were a common feature, while Tombs of the Unknown Soldier containing a selected, unidentified body, and empty cenotaph monuments commemorated the numerous unidentifiable corpses and those servicemen whose bodies were never found. Ceremonies were often held at the memorials, including those on Armistice Day, Anzac Day and the Fêtes de la Victoire, while pilgrimages to the sites of the conflict and the memorials there were common in the inter-war years.

Much of the symbolism included in memorials was political in tone, and politics played an important part in their construction. Many memorials were embroiled in local ethnic and religious tensions, with memorials either reflecting the contribution of particular groups to the conflict or being rejected entirely by others. In several countries it proved difficult to produce memorials that appealed to and included the religious and political views of all of a community. The Fascist governments that came to power in Italy and Germany during the inter-war period made the construction of memorials a key part of their political programme, resulting in a number of larger memorial projects with strong national overtones being constructed in the 1930s. While few memorials embraced a pacifist perspective, some anti-war campaigners used the memorials for rallies and meetings. Many of the political tensions of the inter-war period had diminished by the end of the 20th century, allowing some countries to commemorate the events of the war through memorials for the first time since the end of the war. The memory of the war became a major theme for scholars and museums during the First World War centenary.

== Background ==
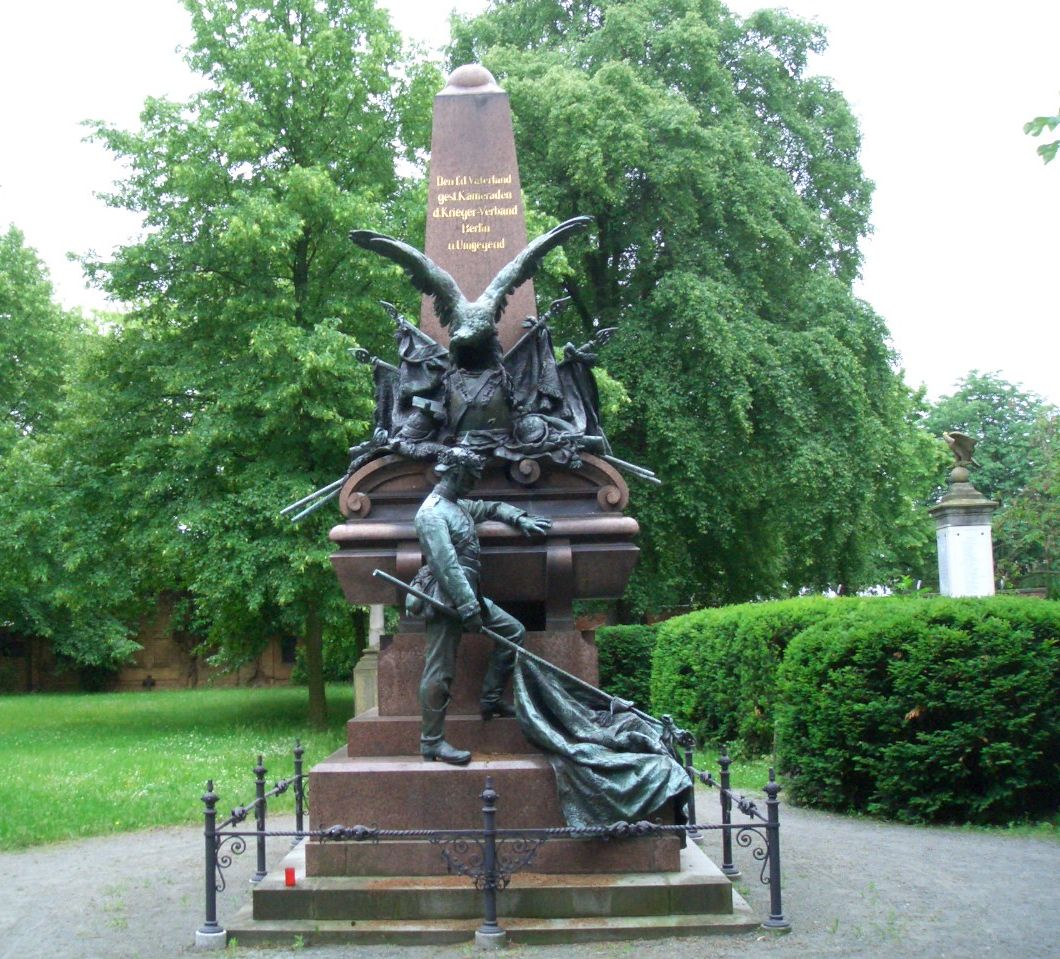
One of many German war memorials in Berlin to the dead of the Franco-Prussian War of 1870–71, by Johannes Boese

On the eve of World War I there were no traditions of nationally commemorating mass casualties in war. France and Germany had been relatively recently involved in the Franco-Prussian War of 1870 to 1871. Germany had built a number of national war memorials commemorating their victory, usually focusing on celebrating their military leaders. In France, memorials to their losses were relatively common, but far from being a national response, and many towns and villages did not erect memorials at all. A new organisation, the Souvenir Français, was established in the 1880s to protect French war memorials and encourage young French people to engage in military activities; the organisation grew to have many contacts in local government by 1914.

Britain and Australia had both sent forces to participate in the Second Boer War of 1899 to 1902, which spurred an increased focus on war memorials. The Boer War had involved 200,000 British volunteers alone, and attracted considerable press coverage. Numerous war memorials were erected on their return, either by local community leaders or by the local Lord Lieutenant, acting on behalf of the county regiments; these were often situated in quiet locations to allow for peaceful reflection by visitors. Australia had honoured its volunteers by placing individual plaques inside buildings, creating outdoor memorial tablets and erecting obelisks in public places. Although the Boer War encouraged a shift away from memorials portraying heroic commanding officers, as had been popular earlier in the 19th century, towards depicting ordinary soldiers, annual ceremonies surrounding the memorials were not common and no official memorial day emerged. Boer War memorials in both countries were widely felt to lack a suitable quality of design and execution, echoing contemporary concerns in the US about the statues erected to commemorate the American Civil War.

The new European states that had formed in the second half of the 19th century typically had traditions of war memorials, but nothing on the scale that would later emerge from World War I. Italy built various war memorials after unification in the 1860s, but there was little agreement about who should be responsible for these within the new Italian state. Romania erected a number of heroically styled memorials after the Romanian War of Independence in 1877 and 1878, usually celebrating famous leaders associated with Romanian independence, but also including the occasional modest local monuments. Bulgaria and Serbia constructed many war memorials after the end of the First Balkan War in 1913. The public played little role in these eastern European memorials, however, which were typically constructed by the central state authorities.

== World War I ==
=== Experience of the conflict ===
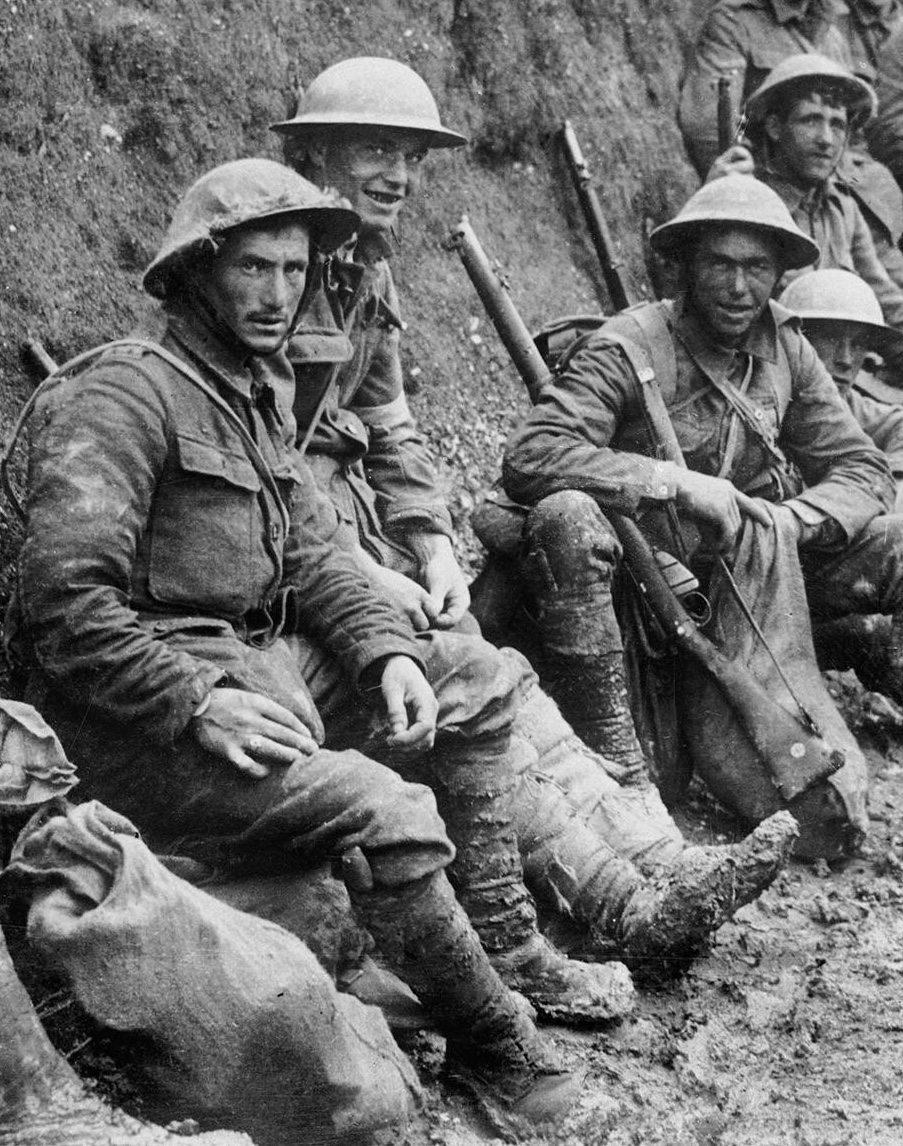
Royal Irish Rifles soldiers resting in a communication trench early in the Battle of the Somme

The memorials to World War I were shaped by the traumatic nature of the conflict and its impact on individuals and communities. The experience of the different nations varied considerably, but common themes emerged. The war required a mass call to arms, with a significant percentage of the population mobilised to fight, either as volunteers or through conscription. Campaigns were conducted on multiple fronts across Europe and beyond. The fighting was mechanised and conducted on an industrial scale; existing weapons, such as machine guns and artillery, were combined with the innovative deployment of aircraft, submarines and poison gas. In many theatres of operation, mobile campaigns degenerated into static trench warfare, depending on the slow attrition of the enemy over many years for victory. The battles spread across larger areas than ever before, with key engagements, such as that at Verdun, etched on the memories of the nations involved.

One result of this style of warfare was a level of casualties unknown in previous conflicts. Approximately 2 million Germans and 1.3 million Frenchmen died during the war; 720,000 British soldiers died, 117,000 American soldiers were killed, and 61,000 Canadian, 60,000 Australian, and 18,000 New Zealand servicemen also died. On the Eastern front, 300,000 Romanians died. The war had a global impact, and at least 2,000 Chinese died in the European theatre of the conflict. Many of the deaths occurred within a short period of time, or affected particular groups: half of France's casualties occurred during the first 17 months of the war, for example, while the French middle and upper classes suffered disproportionate losses. Many of those who survived were injured in the course of the fighting; some injuries, such as facial traumas, resulted in the victim being shunned by wider society and banned from public events. These losses also left large numbers of widows and orphans – 1.36 million in France alone – and affected most families in some way: in Australia, every second family had lost a relative. Even those left at home had suffered extensively from stress, anxiety and grief.

The war had also led to political tensions, revolution and turmoil. In Russia, the conflict resulted in revolution and civil war between 1917 and 1923, and the rise to power of the Communist Bolshevik government. The German Empire had seen revolution break out at the end of the war, with vicious street fighting in the major cities, including Berlin; some Germans felt that this experience was too quickly forgotten in the post-war years. Romania almost descended into revolution as well. There was turmoil in Ireland; 210,000 Irish served in the war as part of the British forces, but the Easter Rising in Dublin in 1916 led in turn to the Irish War of Independence and the later civil war. Elsewhere the war exposed simmering ethnic and religious divisions. In Canada, for example, the distinctions between the English, largely Protestant, and French speaking, predominantly Catholic, parts of the country become increasingly apparent, with conscription becoming a major political issue.

In the years after the war, veterans, the bereaved and the rest of society focused, to the point of obsession, with the problem of death. There was tremendous interest in creating war memorials that celebrated the themes of glory, heroism and loss. In part, there was a rupture or dislocation with the pre-war norms of how memorials should look and feel; communities sought to find new, radical ways to mourn the millions of dead, killed in an essentially modern conflict. In other ways, the building of memorials drew on traditional forms and ideas, drawing on existing religious and architectural themes to explore loss and grief.

=== Responses during the war ===
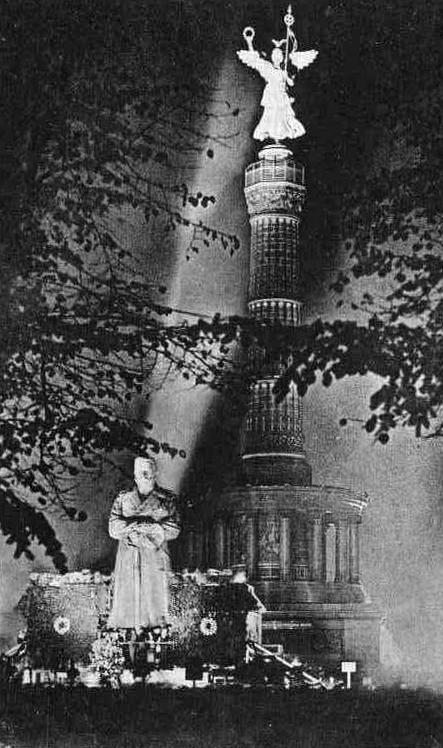
Nagelfigur of Paul von Hindenburg in Berlin, 1915

As the war progressed, memorials began to be created in most countries, either in civic centres, personal homes or on the battlefields themselves. Memorials took various names across Europe; amongst English-speaking countries, such memorials had previously been called fallen soldiers' monuments, but the term "war memorial" became popularised by the conflict, drawing attention to the role of society as a whole in the events. Germany followed suit, terming the memorials Kriegerdenkmal, warrior monument. By contrast France and Italy termed them monuments aux morts and monumenti ai caduti: monuments to the dead, an explicit reference to the deceased. Many of these memorials were in private homes rather than in public places, as bereaved families often made domestic memorials, using photographs of the deceased and personal objects sent back from the front.

In Britain and Australia, early memorials were closely linked to the need to promote military recruitment and the state had an ambivalent attitude towards the informal memorials that emerged during the conflict. In Britain, stone memorials to the war began to be erected in towns and villages from 1915 onwards; some of these were given out by the state as rewards to communities for meeting military recruitment targets. In Australia, the existing memorials to mark the Boer War were used initially for commemorative ceremonies intended to increase military recruitment. As casualties increased, rolls of honour listing the dead began to be displayed in Britain and honour tablets with the names of those who had enlisted were put up inside Australian buildings: Australia used these lists to apply moral pressure on those who were not yet joined up. Informal memorials began to multiply as the war progressed. Local Australian groups erected small monuments, such as drinking fountains and stone pillars, to the point where the government became concerned about the expenditure on them and passed a law in 1916 to control their numbers. In Britain, some Anglican church leaders began to create street war shrines to the dead. These cheap, local memorials were mainly constructed in working class districts, often built from wood and paper, and were used for holding short services in honour of the dead and to hold donations of flowers. They were criticised, however, as promoting Catholic ritualism. Official support for the shrines only came after a national newspaper campaign, efforts by the Lord Mayor of London and a well-publicised visit from Queen Mary to a shrine, and standardised stone shrines then began to replace the earlier, temporary versions.

Across the German Empire nagelfiguren, war memorials made from iron nails embedded in wood, became popular, particularly in Austria. These took various forms, including knights, shields, eagles and crosses, as well as submarines. This practice had medieval origins, and the memorials were reinforced by the promotion of burgfrieden during the war, a medieval pact in which disparate German communities would put aside their differences during a conflict. In some cases, relatives of the deceased were encouraged to hammer memorial nails in as part of the ceremonies, while children might be encouraged to read out poems in a medieval style. At some nagelfiguren a charge was made for each nail used, with the revenues donated to charities supporting soldiers, orphans and others affected by the conflict.

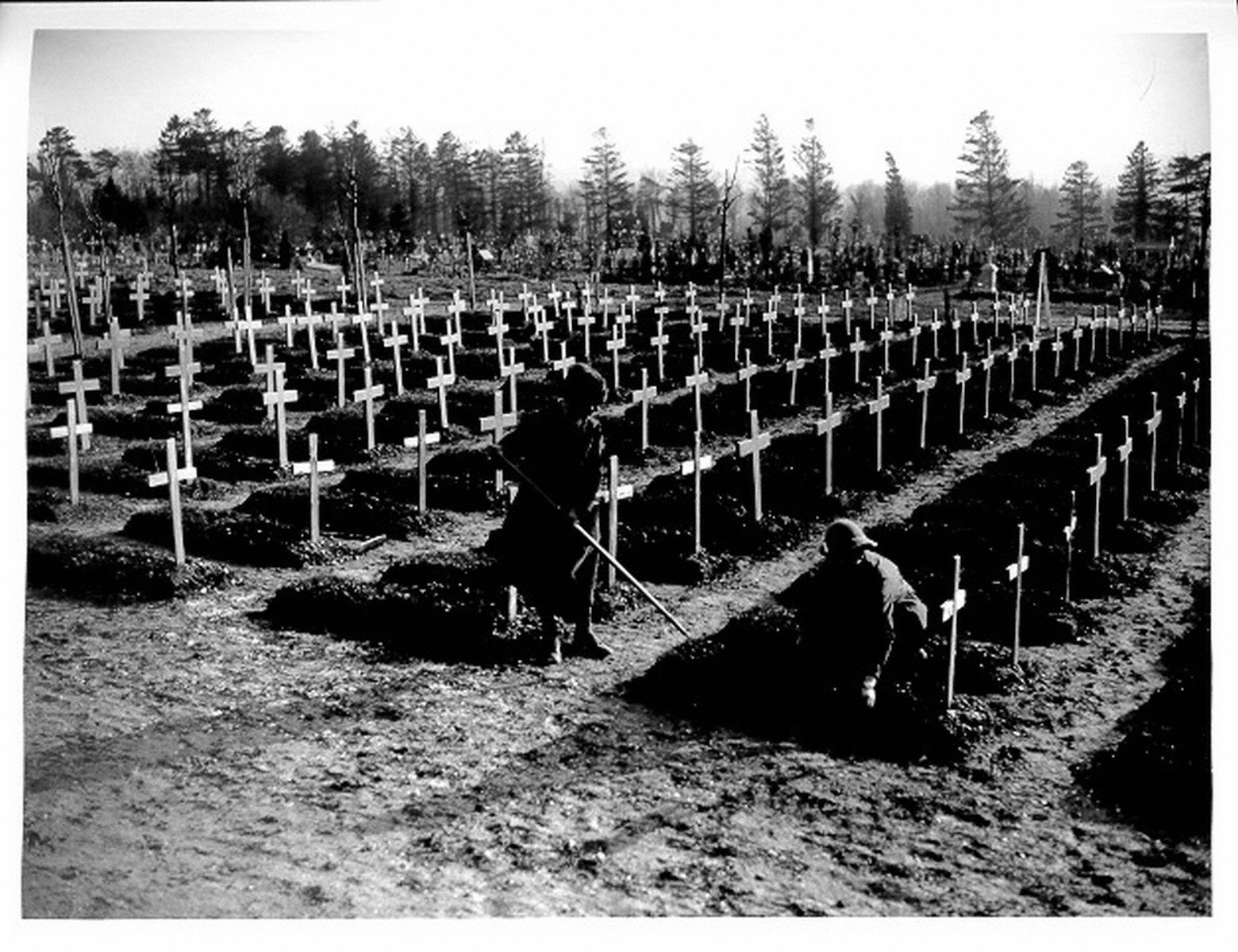
British war cemetery in early 1918 with temporary crosses at Abbeville, France

Some relatively large memorials were constructed during the war. The largest nagelfiguren was a statue of General Hindenburg, famous for his victory over the Russians in Prussia at the battle of Tannenberg; the 12 m-tall (39 ft) statue was put up in Berlin, complete with scaffolding to allow participants to reach the statue and hammer nails in. By the end of the war, architects in Germany were already considering how to commemorate the dead. A large, temporary memorial shrine was built in Hyde Park in August 1918, with over 100,000 visitors in its first week: it lasted over a year. The Hyde Park shrine encouraged debate in Britain about permanent war memorials in the major cities and towns. Museums to remember the events of the war also began to be commissioned; governmentally: the Imperial War Museum in Britain in 1917, Australia began a War Museum in 1917; privately, the repository of wartime records in France, Germany the Kriegsbibliothek.

During the conflict itself, monuments were erected near the battlefields and the temporary cemeteries being used to store the dead. It had been hoped in Britain to repatriate the war dead, but this rapidly proved entirely impractical, leading to haphazard, improvised arrangements around the battlefields. By 1916 over 200 war cemeteries had been commissioned in France and Belgium, prompting debate about what longer term memorials might be appropriate at these sites. The government was concerned that unsuitable, even distasteful memorials might be erected by relatives at the cemeteries and the decision was taken that the cemeteries would be controlled by the state, and that a uniform design would be applied to the memorials at the graves. French cemeteries were used for as memorial sites for ceremonies by injured soldiers during the war and many towns began to name streets and squares after Verdun. In Belgium, where the movement of the war and losses of territory had meant that the Flemish elements of the population were increasingly forming a disproportionate percentage of the army, the language on the memorial headstone gradually became an issue, leading to calls for the creation of heldenhuldezerkjes, headstones inscribed in Flemish, rather than the usual French. In Imperial Russia, the Moscow City Fraternal Cemetery was constructed for the war dead in 1915 by the Imperial royal family and senior Moscow political leaders, who hoped that its inspiring architecture would ensure patriotism in future generations of Russians.

== Inter-war ==
=== Construction ===
==== Commissioning memorials ====
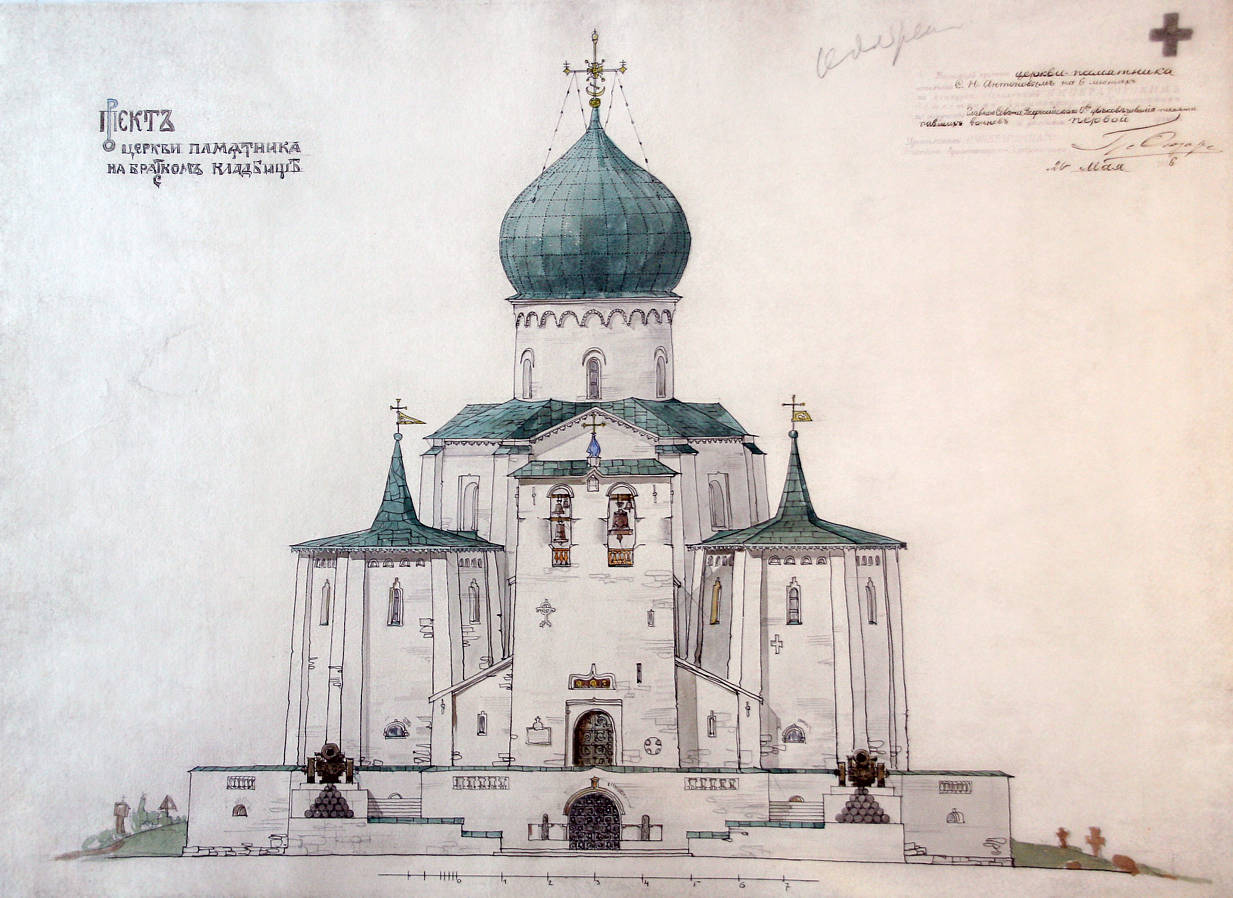
Design for a war memorial church in Tsarskoye Selo, Russia, 1916

Various different mechanisms for commissioning the construction of war memorials emerged during the inter-war period. In most of the nations involved in the conflict, the memorials erected in towns and cities were usually commissioned by local community leaders and other civic groups, with relatively little or no central state involvement. Some national organisations emerged, including the British War Memorials Committee and the Canadian War Memorials Fund, but these focused on narrow, limited projects, rather than trying to coordinate a national response. The local processes and committees could result in multiple memorials being created for the same community or event: the site of Verdun was commemorated by three different memorials, for example, while some British towns saw rival memorials created by competing groups in the community.

In contrast, the construction of war cemeteries, graves and their associated memorials were typically placed under the control of a central state authority. The Imperial War Graves Commission (IWGC) took on this role for Britain and her empire. The Commissione nazionale per la onoranze ai caduti di guerra in Italy coordinated the military repatriation of bodies and the construction of cemeteries. The German war graves commission, the Volksbund Deutsche Kriegsgräberfürsorge (VDK), was established in 1919, and took strict control over the creation and style of German war cemeteries. The American Battle Monuments Commission oversaw US military graves in a similar fashion.

In Britain and Australia, local community leaders were expected to organise local committees to create war memorials. Britain had a strong tradition of local government, and mayors, council chairmen or similar leaders would usually step forward to establish a memorial committee. These committees might then bring in a wider cross-section of local community leaders, including Christian clergy, Jewish leaders, voluntary organisations, rifle clubs and volunteer police, although sometimes committees were more tightly controlled by local government officials. Former servicemen occasionally felt that their opinions were excluded from the formal processes, while in other cases complaints were made that the wealthier members of the community were given a disproportionate role in decision-making. In both Britain and Australia, local memorials were also supplemented by other memorials that reflected wider groups in society, such as military units or particular sports, hobbies or even animals. (Note: British memorials particularly liked to commemorate the horses who died during the war; 375,000 were killed during the conflict.) North America largely followed a similar process. In Canada, the early memorials to the war were typically organised by groups of former soldiers, the Canadian Legion or local authorities. There was considerable discussion in the US during 1919 about the need to construct a suitably grand, national monument to commemorate the war dead, but the discussions failed to produce a consensus and no project was undertaken; monuments such as the Liberty Memorial in Kansas City, Missouri were built by local citizens.

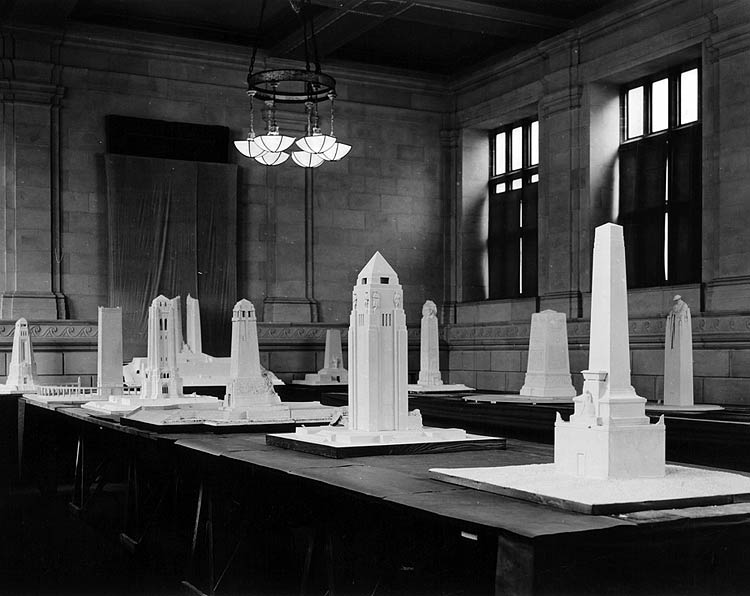
Competition designs for the Canadian National Vimy Memorial

In other countries, the state played a stronger role in the process of commissioning memorials. France, for example, mostly relied on local communities to organise and commission most war memorials, but the state played a comparatively larger role than in Britain and similar countries. A law was passed in 1919 establishing an official role for local government officials in the process of commissioning memorials; many towns then formed committees to take this process forward, typically at the commune level. Members of the Souvenir Français organisation played an important role in many of the resulting local committees. In other cases, governments increased their role in commissioning memorials during the inter-war period. In Romania, most memorials in the early 1920s were initially erected by local communities; in 1919 the royal family created the "Societatea Cultul Eroilor Morţi" (The Cult of the Fallen Heroes Society) to oversee commemoration of the war more generally; the organisation was headed by the Patriarch of the Romanian Orthodox Church. By the 1930s official concern over the diverse range of designs led to increased central control over the process.

Other memorials were commissioned by international veteran organizations, like FIDAC (Interallied Federation of War Veterans Organisations). After its foundation in 1920, FIDAC organised its first congress in Paris in 1921, where it launched the idea of raising a memorial to celebrate the allied forces. At their congress in Rome in 1925, Cointe Hill in Liège, Belgium was chosen as the site of this memorial. The construction began in 1928 and was completed in 1937. The Memorial included the Sacré-Cœur Church (Basilica of the Sacred Heart of Jesus) as a religious building and a tower as a civil memorial. The civil memorial contained numerous monuments offered by the allied nations: France, Italy, United Kingdom, Romania, Greece, Poland, Russia and Spain. These monuments were located both outside (on the esplanade) and inside the votive tower.

The rise of fascism in particular frequently encouraged greater state involvement. In Italy, between the end of the war and 1923 local groups and organisations had established their own local memorials in villages and towns. Not all villages agreed that memorials were appropriate, either for political or religious reasons. With the Fascist revolution, this process became more centralised; veteran groups were assimilated by the Fascist government in 1926, and a systematic attempt to construct suitable national and local memorials followed. In Germany, the political and economic chaos of the immediate post-war years discouraged the construction of civic war memorials and comparatively few civic memorials in their larger towns, mainly due to the shortage of funds in the inter-war German economy and political disagreements between local groups as to what to commemorate and how. Those memorials that were constructed were often built instead by local movements, representing particular factional interests. It was only after the rise of the German Nazi party to power in 1933 that substantial funding began to flow into construction programmes, controlled from Berlin.

As a result of all these processes, large numbers of memorials, more than for any other conflict, were built across the world during the inter-war period. (Note: Calculating the number of war memorials, including World War I memorials, is challenging.) It is estimated that France built around 176,000 war memorials, including around 36,000 in the local communes. Most of the local commune memorials were built by 1922, but those in the towns and cities typically required more protracted negotiations, and their construction stretched into the 1930s. The 1920s were particularly busy for construction of memorials in Britain, although the trend tailed off in 1930s, with the last inter-war memorial unveiled at the town of Mumbles in 1939. The commissioning of Australian war memorials similarly reduced after the mid-1920s. Over 3,500 Romanian memorials were erected. Many German memorials were built during the 1930s. Russia was unusual in building very few war memorials to the events of World War I, mainly as a result of the devastation of the Civil War and the political views of the subsequent Bolshevik government.

==== Community and civic memorials ====
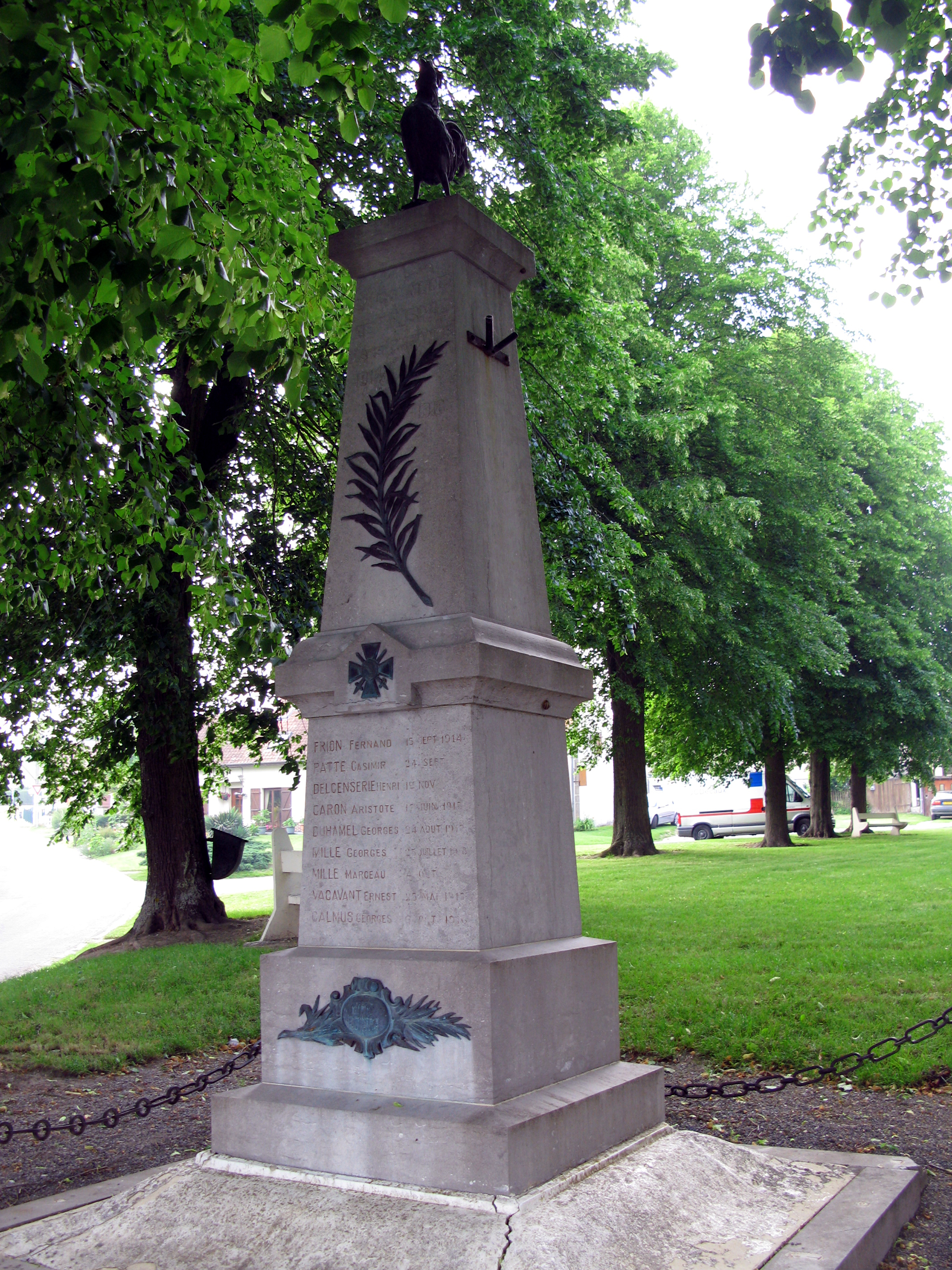
A French obelisk memorial, decorated with the Croix de Guerre, palm of peace and a Gallic rooster

Civic and private memorials in response to the war took many forms, from monuments, sculpture, buildings, gardens, artistic works or special funds to support particular activities. One of the major distinctions between proposed war memorials involved a distinction between utilitarian and non-utilitarian, symbolic designs; in the US, utilitarian memorials were termed "living memorials". Utilitarian memorials were intended to commemorate the dead by having a practical function and typically include projects such as libraries, small hospitals, cottages for nursing staff, parks, clock towers or bowling greens, although in Britain and Canada, large-scale urban redevelopment projects were also proposed, including rebuilding the centre of Westminster to form a huge war memorial complex, and building a subway under the Detroit River. In contrast non-utilitarian memorials, such as monuments, remembered the dead purely through their symbolism or design. Locations could be also contentious: in France, some arguments as to whether market places, for example, were suitable locations: was it good to choose a central location, or did this cheapen the symbolism? In Britain, in a shift from 19th century practices, memorials were typically placed in busy public places.

In some countries, such as France and Germany, utilitarian memorials were considered totally unsuitable; the Germans, for example, thought them unpatriotic and disrespectful to the dead. In other, particularly more Protestant countries, however, a vigorous debate raged as to whether utilitarian or symbolic memorials were more appropriate. In Britain, this debate was spurred on by the formation of various national societies to promote particular perspectives. Some felt that practical memorials failed to remember the war dead properly; others argued that these memorials helped support the survivors of the war and society as a whole. Although these arguments frequently became embroiled in local politics, there was little correlation between national political views and opinions on the form of memorials. Most memorials in Australia were monumental rather than utilitarian, but practical memorials such as hospitals, schools or new roads were increasingly popular in the post war period, although some concerns were raised that these memorials might be later demolished as Australia's towns expanded. In America, utilitarian memorials were more popular, and the establishment of the National Committee on Memorial Buildings supported this trend. The American "living memorial" movement was aided by widespread criticism of the war monuments to the American Civil War, which many felt to have been poorly executed.

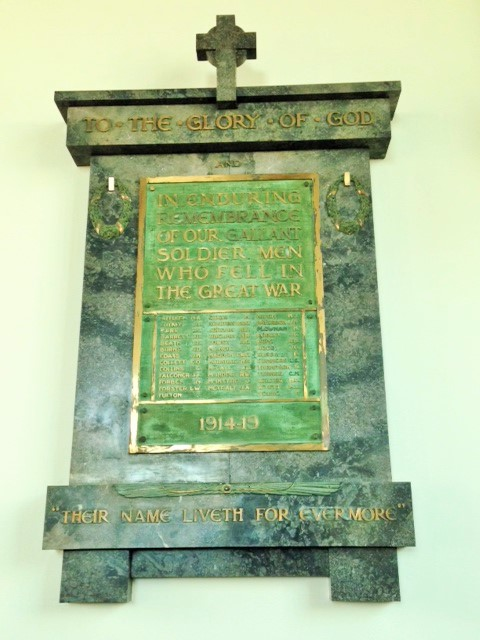
Church memorial, designed in 1920 for Malvern Presbyterian Church, Melbourne

For symbolic memorials, numerous designs were possible, from simple monuments through to much more complex pieces of sculpture. Obelisks had been a popular memorial form in the 19th century and remained so in the inter-war years, including in Britain, France, Australia and Romania. One factor in this popularity was that obelisks were relatively cheap to build, while they also fitted well with the existing civic architecture in many towns. Memorial plaques were another popular memorial style around the world. Soldiers, either individually or in groups, were a popular sculptural feature in most countries, portrayed in various stances; typically these were allegorical, although in France the style of the soldier could also carry political meaning and reflect local political sympathies. Although the trend pre-dated the First World War, very few Western war memorials portrayed heroic commanding officers, as had been popular earlier in the 19th century; if soldiers were depicted, they were invariably ordinary soldiers, usually infantrymen. After the unveiling of the Cenotaph in London, it became a popular design in many other locations in Britain and Australia too.

In other respects, individual countries had different preferences for styles of memorial. French communities usually chose simple monuments, located in public spaces, and deliberately avoided political or religious imagery and rhetoric. In Australia and the US, memorial halls – some of which were large, grand structures – were popular. Australia also created the idea of an Avenue of Honour, involving lines of trees, with memorial plaques, along a road. Canadians often brought back various material from Europe for their memorials, including pieces of local European churches and soil from the relevant battlefields. Individual countries also had typical national symbols that were widely incorporated, from the British Britannia, to the Gallic rooster to the Romanian vulture. Postcards of war memorials were widely produced in Britain and Italy, and ceramic models of the more famous ones, such as the Cenotaph, were sold as souvenirs.

==== Cemeteries ====
The World War I war cemeteries represented important memorials sites to the conflict and typically incorporated specific monuments commemorating the dead. Under the Treaty of Versailles, each country was made officially responsible for maintaining the military graves inside their territories, but the relevant countries of the fallen soldiers were typically granted the freedom to design and build the military cemeteries themselves. Some countries' cemeteries would naturally be on their own soil, but in other cases, such as for Britain and the Dominions, the cemeteries could be relatively distant; the failure to repatriate British war dead from Europe early in the war had proved domestically controversial, and when the US joined the war in 1917 their government had promised relatives that bodies would be repatriated to the US; around 70 percent of the US war dead were sent back. Along the Western front, the cemeteries were typically concentrated in specific locations, with the bodies brought in some distances to form larger cemeteries; elsewhere, the cemeteries tended to be smaller and more scattered.

There was much discussion across the British empire about how the IWGC should commemorate the war dead. The construction of war cemeteries was a clear priority, but there was an ambition to produce a ground-breaking series of memorials to the fallen soldiers and the key battles along the Western front, while in the east there was an urgent political requirement to construct memorials to reinforce Britain's inter-war claims to influence and territories across the region. The Dominions also wanted to have their own national monuments as part of the programme of work. Initially twelve major memorials were planned, each of which would combine a memorial to a key battlefield, a cemetery and a monument to a specific Dominion, but the French government raised concerns over the considerable number and size of these memorials, leading to the plans being halved in scale.

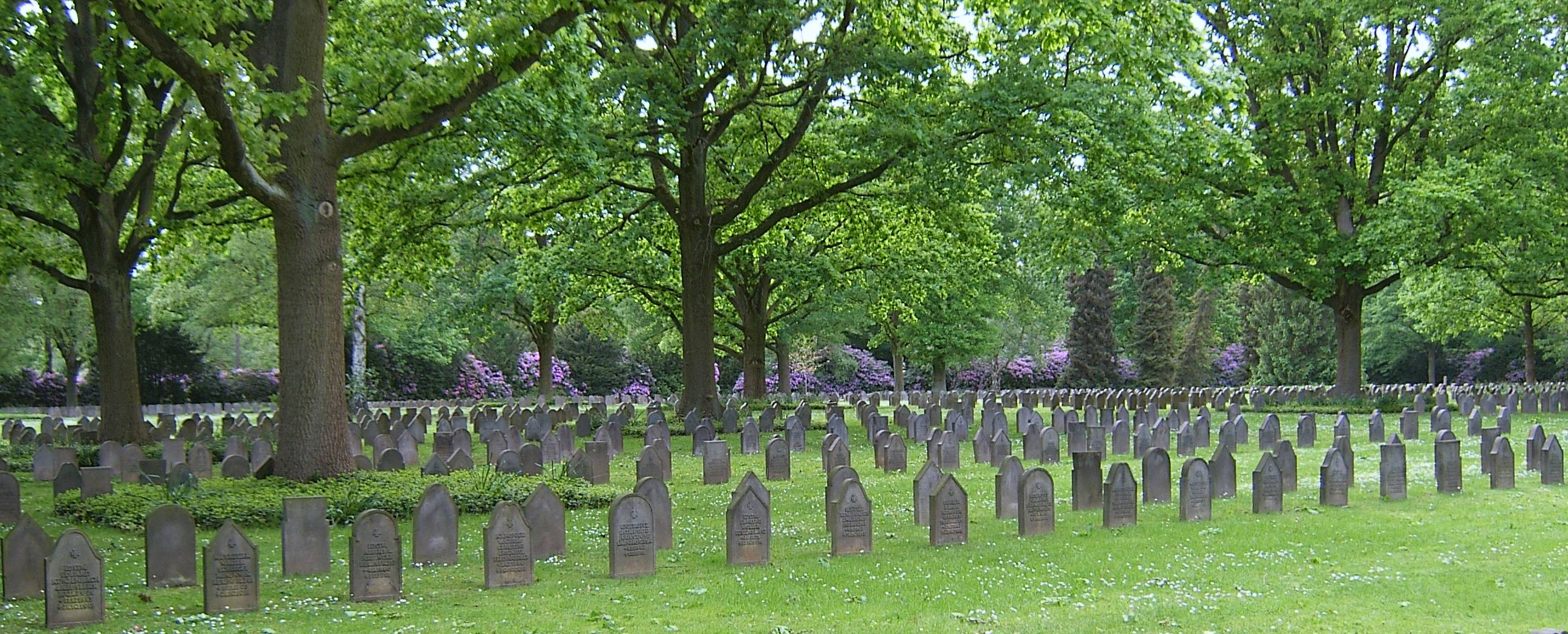
Ohlsdorf Cemetery, Germany

IWGC war cemeteries featured grass and flowers within a walled area, intended to resemble an English garden; almost all were constructed around a War Stone and a Cross of Sacrifice, described in more detail below. The style varied slightly by architect and location, but typically the cemeteries followed classical influences in buildings and monuments, sometimes adapted slightly to appeal to the style of a particular Dominion. The buildings at the cemeteries were important symbolically and formed a key part of these designs. The graves proved controversial: initially they were marked by wooden crosses but, after some argument, it was agreed to replace these with Portland stone markers; the original wooden memorials were in some cases returned to the soldier's next of kin. Each marker was identical in shape and individualised only through the inscription of the name, regiment, date of death, a religious symbol and a short text agreed by the next of kin. Public debate ensued about these graves throughout the 1920s. British officials were concerned about families erecting their own memorials on the sites and detracting from the appearance of the cemeteries; critics complained about the secular nature of the memorials, the limited options for families to individualise the graves and the excessive role of the IWGC in determining how the soldiers were buried.

The construction of the French cemeteries was complicated by even more heated arguments over how the bodies of the war dead should be dealt with. During the conflict the French war dead had ended up being split between special war cemeteries, local civilian cemeteries and some had been returned to their original villages. Catholic traditionalists in the government called for the bodies to be buried together in special cemeteries along the Western front, while others campaigned for them to be returned to local cemeteries. In 1919, the decision was taken to use special war cemeteries and to ban the repatriation of bodies, but by 1920 this decision had been reversed and 300,000 French bodies were repatriated to their original homes. The French war cemeteries were typically much larger than their IWGC equivalents and used concrete Catholic crosses for all the graves, with the exception of the Islamic and Chinese war dead.

German war cemeteries are somewhat different from French and British ones, being more austere and simple in design. They were built around lawns, without flowers or other decorations, intended to highlight acceptance of the tragedy and avoid the expensive and pretentious sentimentality that the German VDK felt Allied cemeteries invoked. German war cemeteries also included heldenhaine, heroes' groves populated with oak trees and large boulders, dolmen. Both symbolising nature; this landscaping was considered to be particularly important for German war cemeteries. The cemeteries used slate grave markers, less individualised than British or French equivalents, and felt to better symbolise the importance of the German nation as a whole.

In eastern Europe, Romania built what were termed heroes' war grave cemeteries, either in existing heroes' cemeteries, on the sites of the World War I battles, or in new cemeteries symbolically placed on the edges of towns. In Serbia, Niś Commonwealth Military Cemetery includes memorials to nurses from the Scottish Women's Hospitals for Foreign Service. The situation was somewhat different in Russia, however, where the Moscow City Fraternal Cemetery was used not just for the war dead of World War I, but also for the casualties of the Civil War, and then the victims of the secret police. It was finally closed by the Bolsheviks in 1925 and turned into a park; subsequently, possibly on the orders of Joseph Stalin, the Eastern Orthodox church building and the headstones were systematically destroyed until almost no trace of the cemetery remained.

A final wave of war cemetery memorials were completed in the 1930s under the Fascist governments of Germany and Italy. The main Italian war cemeteries were not finished until 1938, and their positioning in some cases carried special political meaning, emphasising Italy's right to claim important, but ethnically diverse, border regions. In Germany, the same decade saw the completion of totenburgen, fortresses of the dead, used as war cemeteries and memorials. These were in some senses an extension of the cemetery designs of the 1920s, celebrating a natural German landscape, but included extensive modernist, monumental features, intending to highlight German artistic skill.

==== Battlefields ====
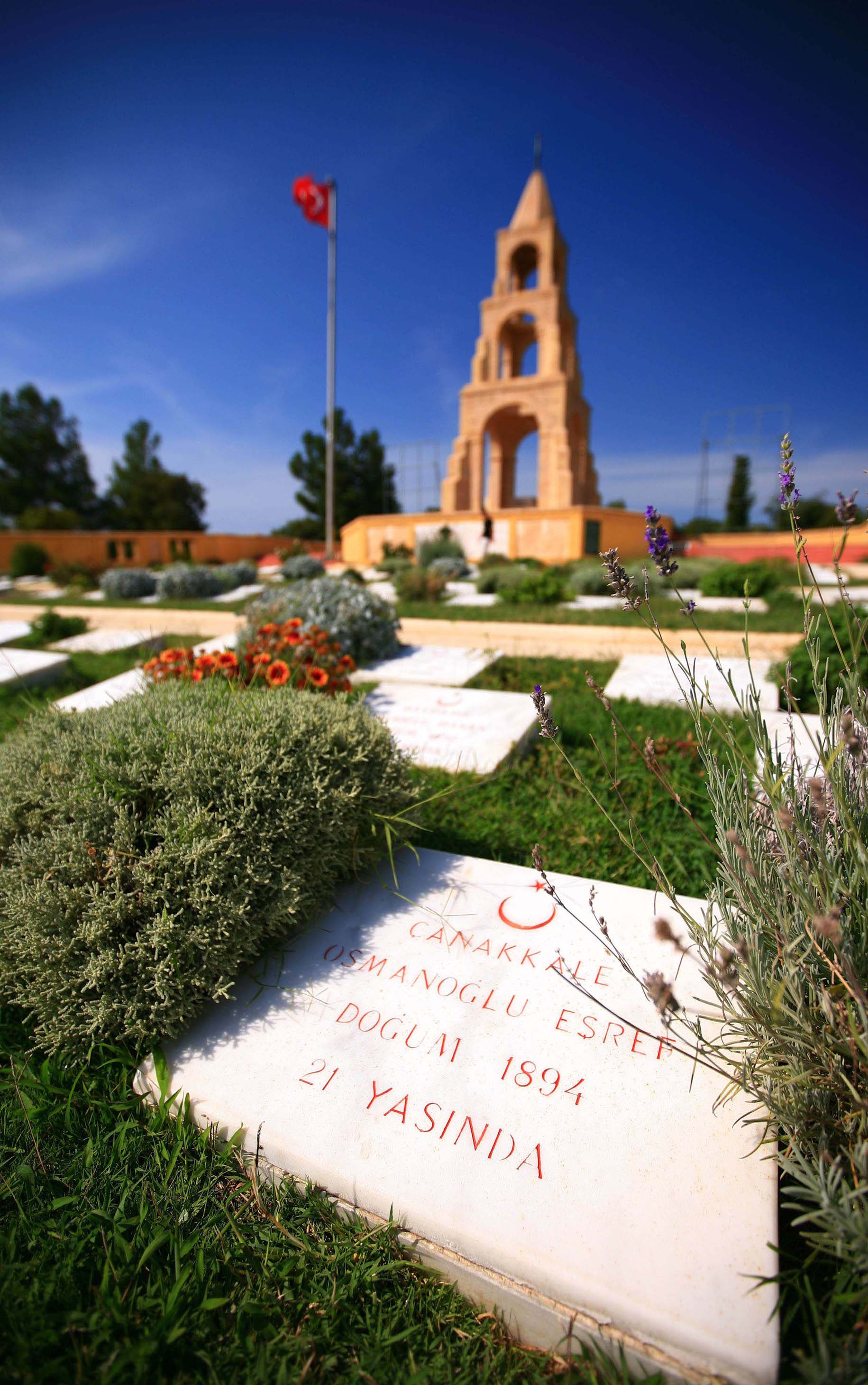
Turkish battlefield monument and cemetery at Gallipoli

Most nations considered certain battlefields particularly important because of the national losses that had been incurred there, and took steps to erect special memorials to them, alongside the cemeteries that held their war dead. The French regarded the battles around Verdun as symbolic of the entire war, while for the British the battle of Ypres in Belgium and the battle of the Somme in France – in particular Thiepval hill – had similar resonances. Australian and New Zealand forces placed special significance on the events of Gallipoli. In the same way, Romania regarded the battles of Mărăşeşti and Mărăşti as hugely significant sites, worth of special remembrance. In the inter-war years, these battlefields were frequently described as forming "sacred" ground because of the number deaths that had occurred there.

National governmental bodies and charities were rapidly formed to produce memorials for these sites. The British government, for example, set up the Battle Exploits Committee in 1919 to create national battlefield memorials, alongside the work of the IWGC. Initially their intent was to celebrate the more heroic aspects of the fighting, and to avoid the flavour of memorials to the fallen that were being built elsewhere; by 1921, however, the committee had entered into a partnership with IWGC and adopted the same focus on the sacrifice of the fallen soldiers. The Canadian Battlefields Memorials Commission (CBMC) was similarly established in 1920 to produce war memorials for the major battlefields involving Canadian forces.

A range of battlefield memorials emerged. The huge Douaumont ossuary was built to remember Verdun through a private French charity, organised by the Bishop of Verdun. The ossuary was deliberately multi-faith, however, with Catholic, Protestant, Jewish and Islamic facilities. The Romanian authorities built a similar mausoleum at Mărăşeşti, explicitly likened to the use French ossuary at Verdun. Amidst some concerns about denigrating the importance of other battlefields, the CBMC focused on producing a single major memorial at Vimy. In Turkey, the entire battlefield of Gallipoli was ceded to Britain and her imperial allies in 1923, and the area was turned into an extended memorial to the war dead. There were no settlements to reconstruct, so the graves were largely left scattered in individual graves or small cemeteries, and the slopes were planted with Australian vegetation. Obelisks were particularly popular memorials at Gallipoli along the ridges, including one obelisk 100 ft high.

There was uncertainty as to how to treat the wider battlefields surrounding these monuments. At the end of the war, visitors and tourists could easily see the damage caused by the war and the detritus of the fighting, but post-war reconstruction meant that by the 1930s most of this damage along the Western front had been restored. In several cases, veterans felt that the battlefields should be maintained in their immediate post-war condition as memorials; the reconstruction of the town of Ypres was opposed by some who favoured keeping the ruins as a memorial. It was proposed to leave the fortifications of Douaumont in ruins as a memorial to the dead of Verdun, and the issue of whether or not to replant the region with trees in the 1930s proved controversial with veterans. Some parts of the trench systems were preserved intact as memorials, however, including the Beaumont-Hamel Newfoundland Memorial and the trench system at the Canadian National Vimy Memorial. In other theatres, such as Iraq and Palestine, reconstruction took much longer and bodies remained unburied at least until 1929.

==== Economics ====
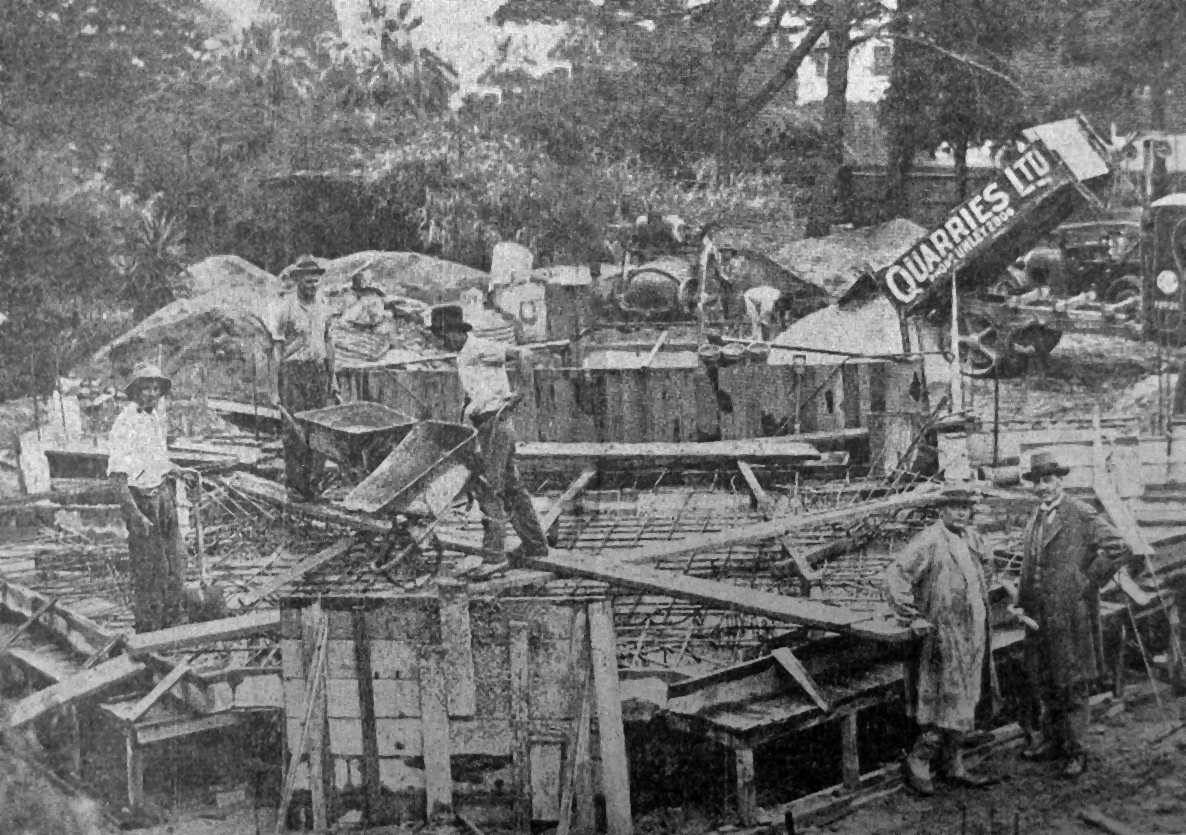
Workers in 1928 constructing the National War Memorial, Adelaide

Resources and funds were needed to construct most memorials, particular larger monuments or building projects; sometimes professional services could be acquired for nothing, but normally designers, workmen and suppliers had to be paid. Different countries approached this problem in various ways, depending on local culture and the role of the state. Despite the special nature of the memorials, contractual arguments and issues over costs, timings and specifications were common, from smaller works in villages through to major works, such as the Vimy Memorial. The sheer volume of work encouraged industrial innovation: carving the inscriptions into the many thousands of British memorial stones had to originally be undertaken by hand, for example, until a Lancashire company invented an automated engraving process.

In Britain, voluntary subscription, rather than funding from local or central government, was considered the only correct way to pay for a war memorial, although it was disputed whether active proactive fundraising was appropriate. Raising the sums required could be quite difficult, and many committees tried various means, including moral blackmail, to exhort larger sums out of the more wealthy members of the community. The amount of money successfully raised varied considerably: the city of Glasgow, with a million inhabitants, raised approximately £104,000 for memorials; Leeds, with around half a million inhabitants, only £6,000. A typical memorial monument in Britain costed between £1,000 and £2,000, but some could be cheaper still; larger pieces, such as the Royal Artillery Memorial, could cost as much as £25,000. Australian communities raised funds in similar ways to their British equivalents, but the process of fund-raising was much more open, and included directly canvassing for donations. Typical Australian projects cost between £100 and £1,000, with the larger memorials costing up to £5,000; bank-loans were also sometimes used. Memorials along the Western front, being larger, cost rather more than their civic equivalents; the Villers–Bretonneux Australian National Memorial, for example, cost the IWGC and Australian government around £40,000.

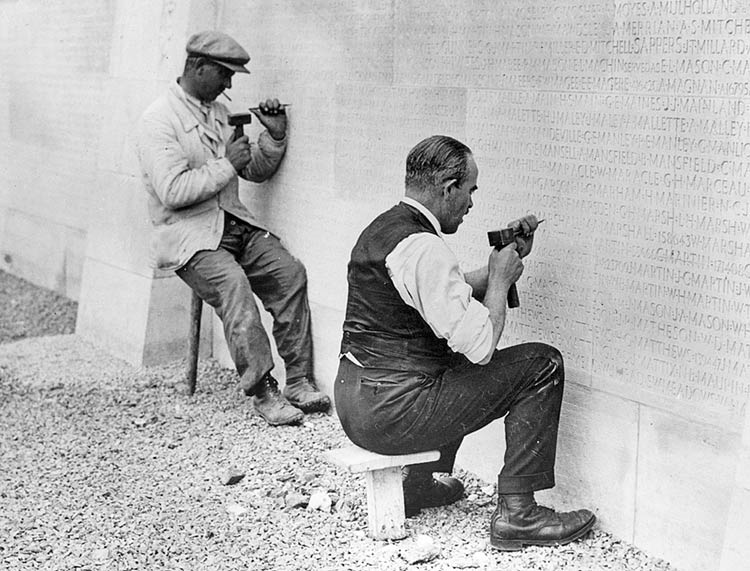
Carving the names into the Canadian National Vimy Memorial

The French approach to funding memorials also relied mainly on voluntary fundraising, but featured a greater role for the state. A law passed in 1919 provided for a subsidy from central government to local authorities to assist in building memorials; the money was distributed in proportion to the number of local citizens who had died in the war. Nonetheless, the largest French projects, such as the Ossuary of Douaumont, were still paid for mostly through private fund raising across France and the international community: it could take many years to raise the sums required. The Ossuary cost 15 m francs to build; at the other end of the scale, more modest urban memorials cost around 300,000 francs.

Much of the inter-war period saw economic recession or stagnant growth, making fund-raising more challenging. Partially as a result, many memorial projects had to be cut back or altered due to lack of money. The final size of Douaumont had to be cut in size by a third when fund-raising slowed. Proposals to turn the planned Imperial War Museum into a grand memorial for the war dead were shelved due to lack of funds.

The construction of memorials produced a lot of business in all the countries involved in the war. In Britain and Australia, stone masons provided large quantities of mass-produced design, often advertising through catalogues, while professional architects acquired the bulk of the specialised commissions for war memorials, making use of their professional organisations. Professional sculptors argued that their work was superior and more appropriate than that of architects, but they received far fewer commissions. British stone masons provided cheap products through catalogues. In France, funeral directors played a large part in the business of producing designs, producing catalogues of their designs for local communities to choose from. In the US, there was sufficient interest that a specialist magazine, Monumental News, was created to support the trade in war memorials.

=== Innovation and grieving ===
==== Naming the dead ====
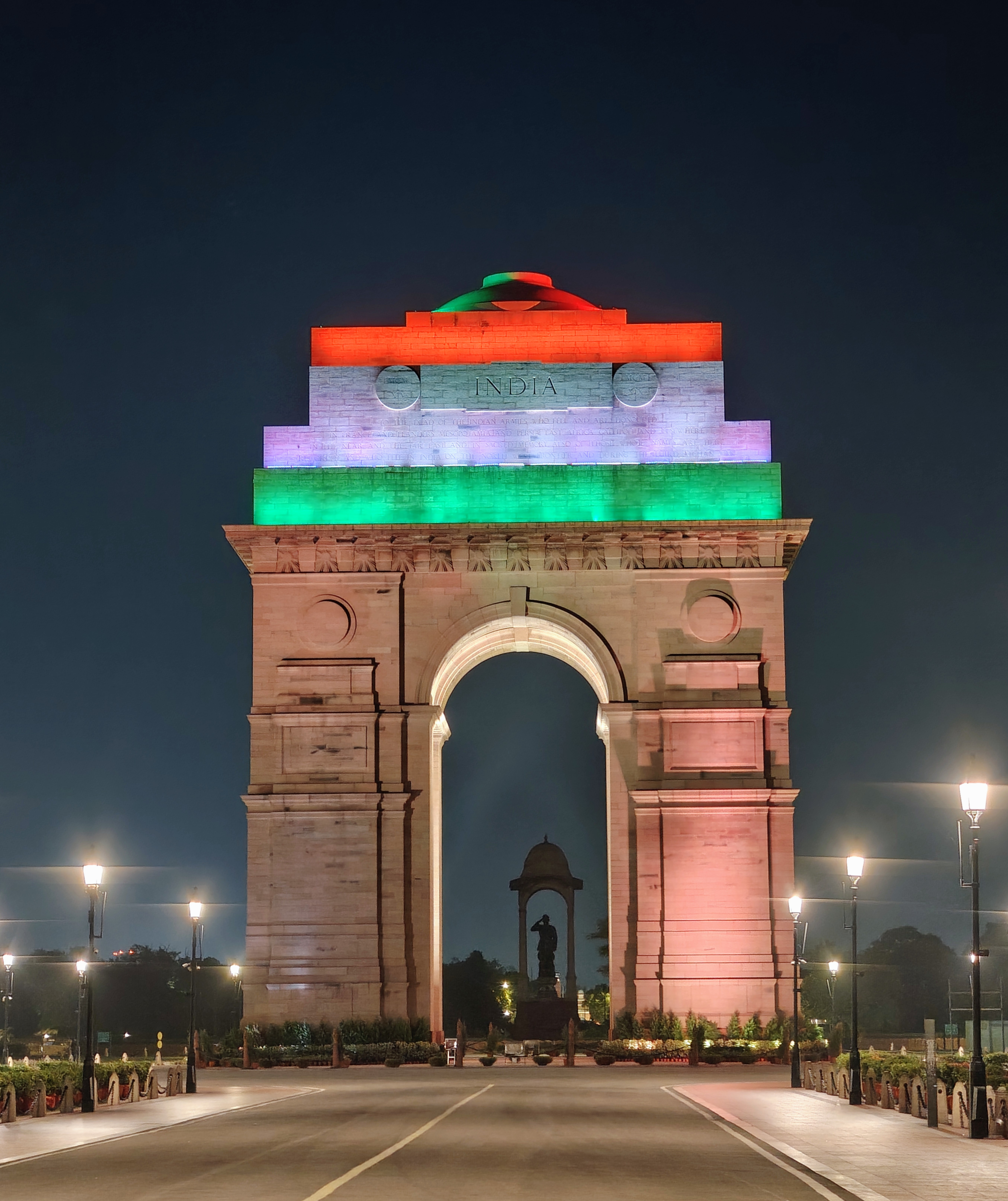
The India Gate in New Delhi was unveiled in 1931 to commemorate the losses of the Indian Army in World War I and the Third Anglo-Afghan War

The deaths caused by World War I were difficult for post-war societies to cope with: their unprecedented scale challenged existing methods of grieving. Furthermore, an expectation had arisen during the war that individual soldiers would expect to be commemorated, even if they were low ranking members of the military. One method used to address this was the inclusion of lists of names. In part, this was a response to the practical problem of commemorating such large numbers of dead, but it carried additional symbolic importance; in some ways, the physical presence of a name acted to compensate for an absent body. The lists could vary in size from the 21 names listed in a small English village like East Ilsley, to the 54,896 names inscribed on the Menin Gate and the 73,357 on the Thiepval Memorial.

Civic memorials in Britain and France typically had names inscribed; in Britain, these were often combined with other mottos or script, in France, where the significance of the name took even greater importance, just the names were used with a simple introduction. In France the names were usually listed in alphabetical order, resembling a military presentation. The British phrase, adopted by IWGC, "their name liveth for evermore", was popularised by Rudyard Kipling, who had lost a son during the war. British lists often omitted the soldier's rank, creating an impression of equality in death. Long lists of names – up to 6,000 – incorporated into churches in England and Germany. In Australia, where the forces were solely volunteers, all those who served were typically recorded on memorials, while in New Zealand, where conscription applied, only the fallen were recorded on memorials.

Touching the names of the dead on memorials was common gesture of grieving in the inter-war period; sometimes mourners would also kiss the names. Visitors to the memorials on the Western front would often photograph or trace on paper the relevant names on the memorials, taking these reminders back with them to their homes. By contrast, the naming of the dead played a less significant role in Italy, where formal lists of the war dead were not established until the mid-1920s; local communities compiled their own lists, used to produce local memorial plaques, but the national lists remained inaccurate for many years.

After the war, a bronze memorial plaque, inscribed with the name of the deceased alongside Britannia and a lion, and a scroll, sent to the next of kin of those had died in the service of the British Empire. Honour rolls in Canada were very popular, particularly immediately after the end of the war, although the decision on which names to include on them proved contentious: should accidental deaths, for example, be included? Where it was impractical to inscribe names in churches, usually due to the number of casualties and available space, books of names were often recorded instead.

==== Cenotaphs and Tombs of the Unknown Soldier ====
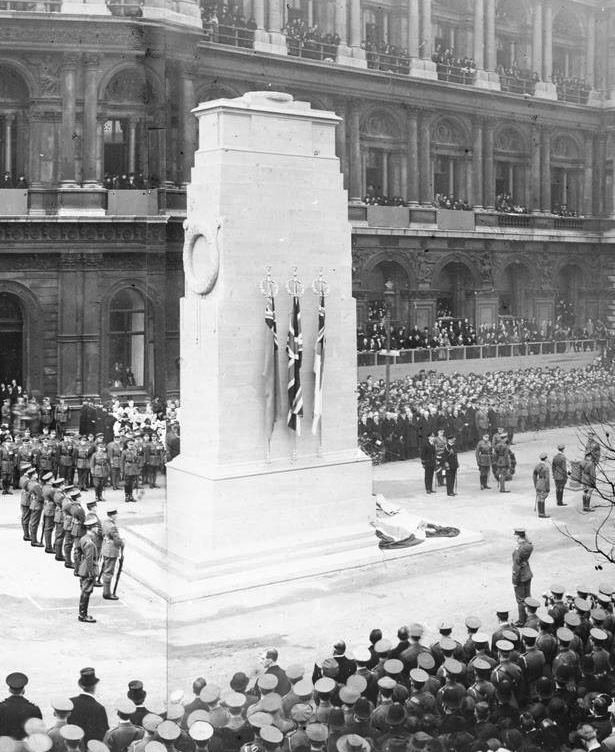
Unveiling of the Cenotaph in London, 1920

A large number of soldiers who died in the war were never found, and similarly bodies were recovered that could not be identified; once again, this required new forms of memorial. The scale of the issue was once again huge: 73,000 Allied dead were never found at the Somme, for example, either because their bodies had been lost, destroyed or were unrecognisable, more than one in ten of the losses in the battle.

One of the key developments in memorials to the war, the cenotaph, used an empty tomb to symbolise these aspects of the war. In 1919, Britain and France planned victory marches through their respective capitals and as part of this France decided to erect a temporary cenotaph, an empty sarcophagus monument, which would be saluted by the marching troops. The British Prime Minister David Lloyd George decided that a similar but non-denominational memorial should be built in London, despite ministerial concerns that a cenotaph was an inappropriate, Catholic form of monument, and that it might be desecrated. The victory marches went ahead; French political leaders had the memorial in Paris removed immediately after the parade, on the basis that it was too Germanic in appearance, but the London cenotaph proved very popular and hundreds of thousands flocked to see it. The popularity of the temporary Cenotaph resulted in it remaining open until the following year, when the decision had to be taken about what to do with the decaying structure: there was concern from the government that a permanent memorial might be vandalised, while the popular press criticised any suggestion of dismantling the existing structure. A new, permanent cenotaph designed by Sir Edwin Lutyens was commissioned and unveiled on Whitehall on Armistice Day 1920, effectively turning this part of London into a memorial to the war; over a million people visited the site during November that year. The memorial style became very popular and spread to other countries in the subsequent years.

In contrast to the empty cenotaph, another new form of memorial, the Tomb of the Unknown Soldier, used the idea of burying one of the unidentified bodies from the war as a symbolic memorial to all of the lost soldiers. This idea had begun to emerge towards the end of the war, and was actively promoted by some British veterans' groups in 1919. Initially, however, it failed to gain traction with the government because of the success of the Whitehall Cenotaph, and a second memorial was felt to be unnecessary. Finally, in 1920, following lobbying by British cleric David Railton, Britain and France both decided to create a Tomb of the Unknown Soldier, choosing an unknown body and creating a special memorial around it; the tombs were inaugurated on Armistice Day. The choice of location for the French tomb proved controversial, however, and it was not finalised until the following year, when the body was laid to rest under the Arc de Triomphe. The concept proved popular, and encouraged similar memorials in other countries.

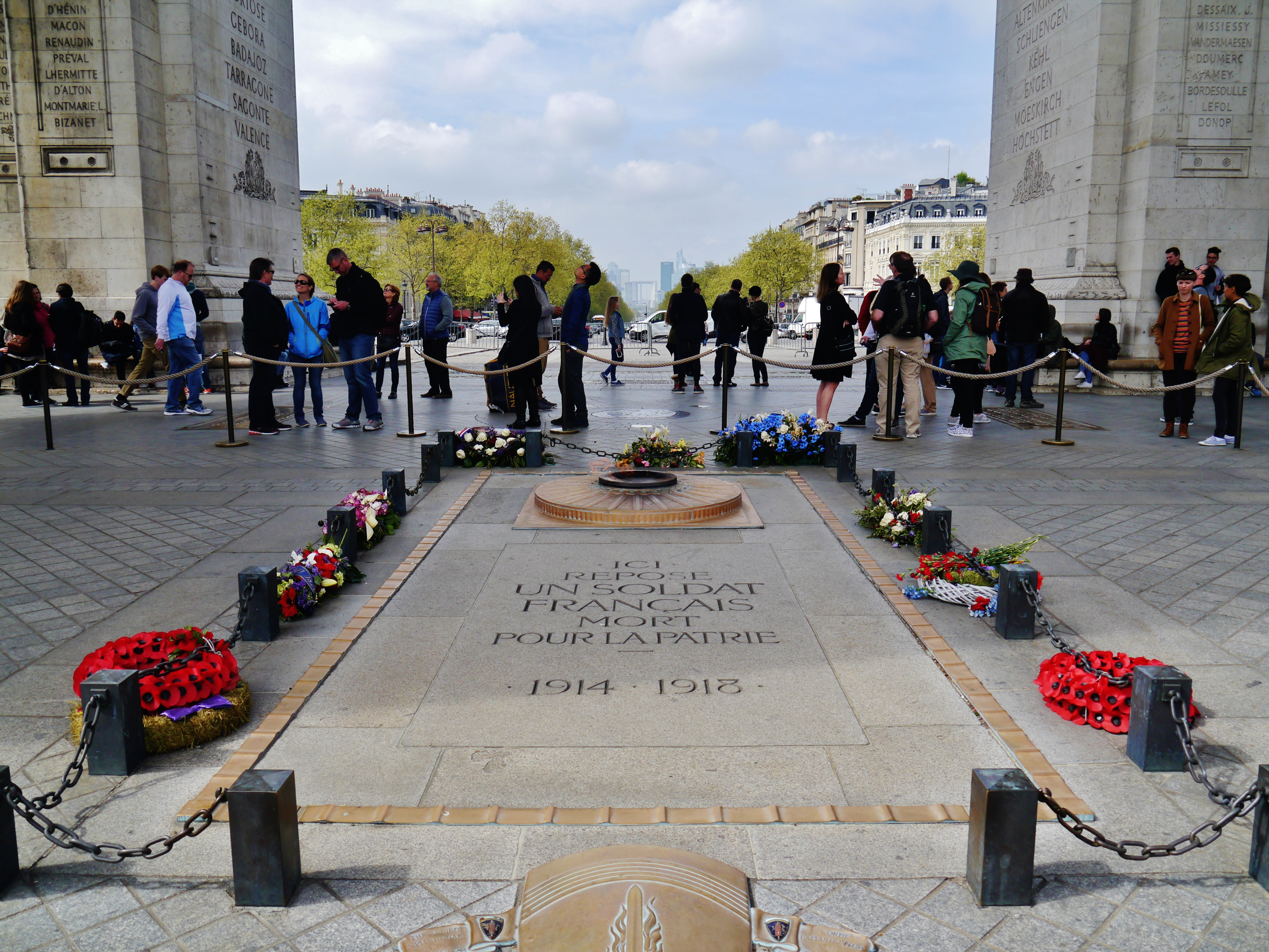
The Tomb of the Unknown Soldier, Paris

In Italy, the idea of an Unknown Soldier memorial was particularly popular, both because lists of memorial names were less common and because Italy had suffered particularly heavily from unidentifiable casualties as a result of the campaigns in the Alps – as many of 60% of the corpses buried at Redipuglia were unidentifiable. The Tomb of the Unknown Soldier in Rome was built in 1921, with other unidentifiable bodies being adopted by local cults of the dead across Italy. The Italian tomb was significant in political terms; Italy was deeply divided in the post-war years and the Liberal government hoped that the opening would reunify the country. In practice, the tomb became a point of tension between the Liberals and the Italian Fascist movement, and Benito Mussolini claimed to have timed his seizure of power the next year to ensure that the 1922 ceremonies at the tomb would occur under a Fascist government.

Other countries considered similar memorials. The US constructed a Tomb of the Unknown Soldier in 1921; while the idea was clearly a foreign concept, it proved very popular with the American public and by 1936 was attracting over 1.5 m visitors a year and acting as an informal national monument to the war. Edwin Redslob, part of the German government, supported a similar scheme in 1925, but without success, and Mainz Cathedral and Ulm Minster were later proposed as options for a tomb. In Germany, a tomb was not finally built until 1935, when it was sponsored by the Nazi government; the final memorial contained 20 bodies of unknown German soldiers from the Eastern front. Other countries also constructed tombs, including Belgium and Portugal, and as in France and Britain these tombs were placed in capital cities; there was an abortive attempt to place the Romanian tomb at Mărăşeşti, but this proved impractical for both logistic and ceremonial reasons. Canada, Australia and New Zealand declined to build their own tombs, as they were considered to be represented by the burial in London.

==== Ceremonies ====
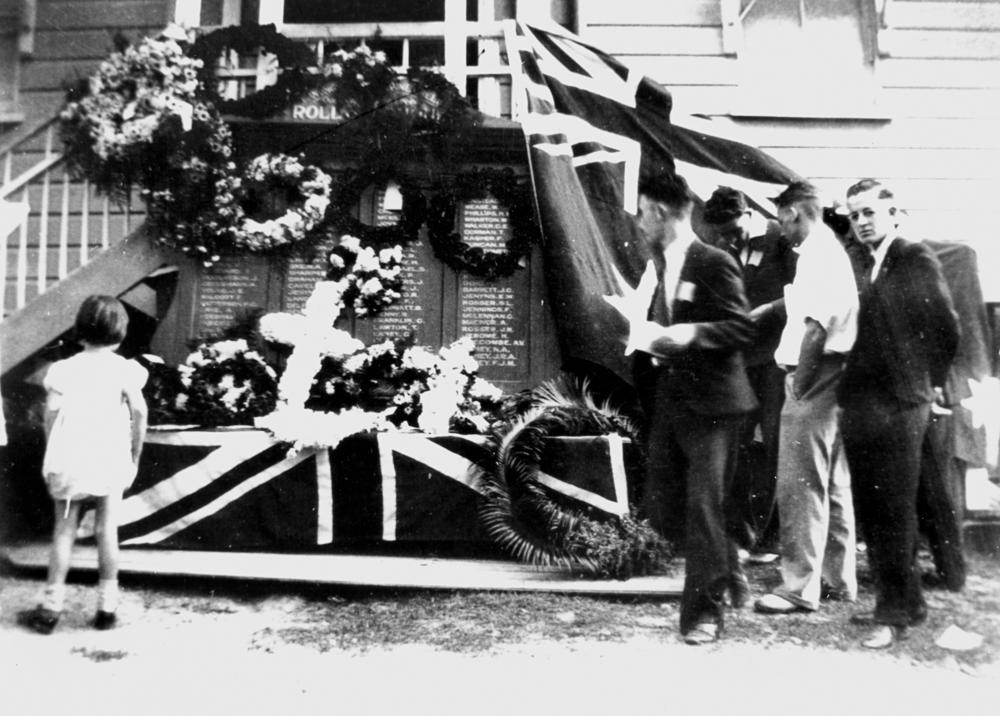
Anzac Day ceremony at Canungra's honour board memorial, Australia, 1937

Ceremonies came to surround many memorials; many memorials were formally opened or unveiled in public ceremonies, while others were used for recurring ceremonies on commemorative days. Memorials in Britain and France were typically opened in civic ceremonies involving local dignitaries, veterans and the next-of-kin of fallen servicemen. Some memorials acquired daily ceremonies; in 1928 it became customary to play the Last Post bugle call at the Menin Gate memorial each evening, for example, and this practice spread to many other similar memorials in France.

Some ceremonies were formed around the memorials on specific days of the year. During the war, the British had commemorated the 4 August as Remembrance Day, but this was superseded at the end of the conflict by Armistice Day on 11 November each year. (Note: Britain initially termed Armistice Day "Armisticetide" in the years following the war.) It became the norm for ceremonies to be held at memorials across Britain at 11 am on this day, supported by two minutes of silence, instituted by the Government, police and local authorities. The London Cenotaph formed the national hub for these ceremonies from 1919 onwards; at the first Armistice Day ceremony, it received 500,000 visitors in four days. The ceremony at the Cenotaph was equated to a religious event: the Daily Mail, for example, described the emotion and the "mystic meaning" at the ceremony which combined to produce a special "halo" and an "aura". Ceremonies at the Cenotaph were covered and photographed by the national papers, and national radio broadcasts of the event commenced in 1928.

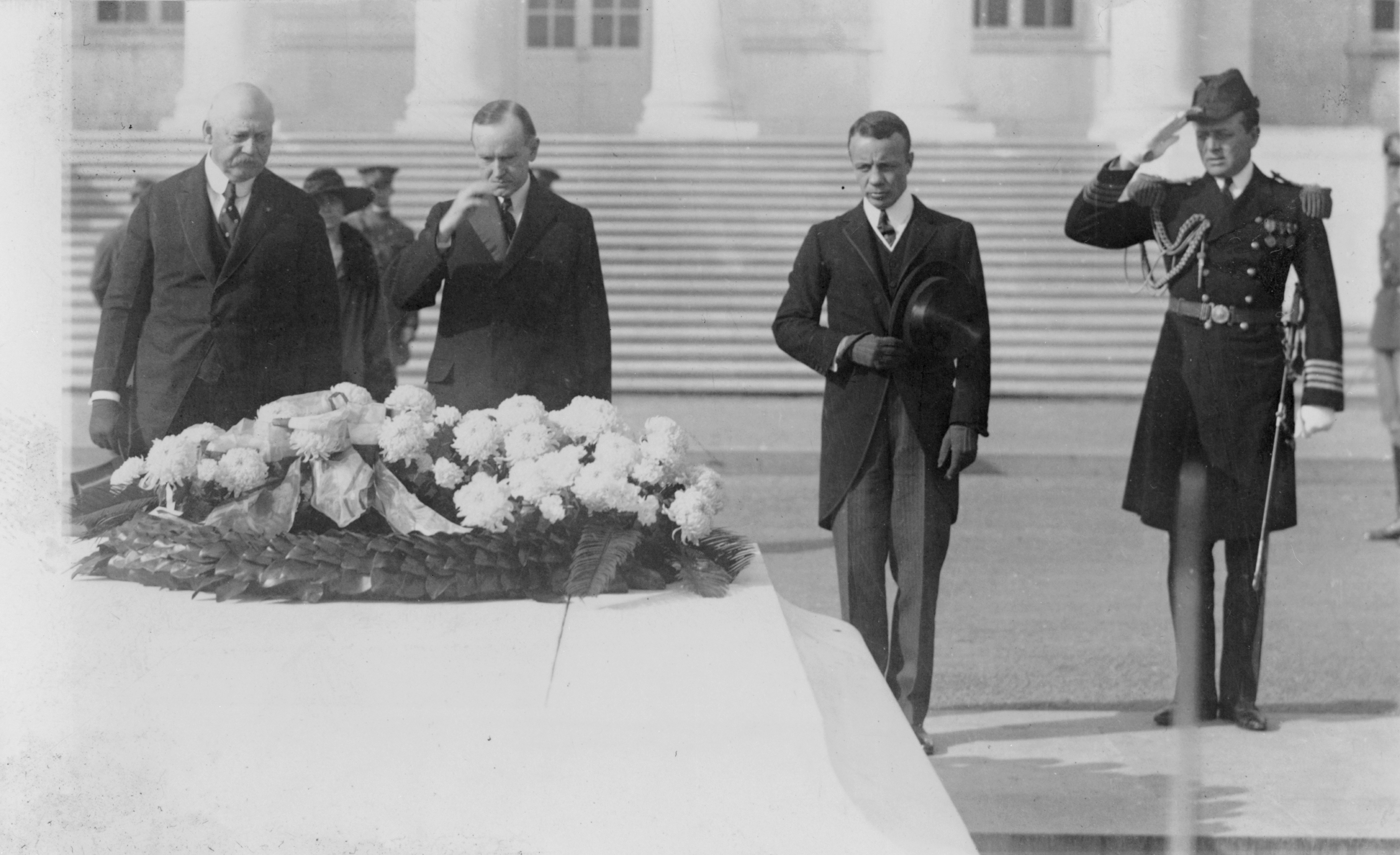
President Calvin Coolidge at the US Tomb of the Unknown Soldier, 1923

Armistice Day ceremonies also became important in France. The early ceremonies were organised by veterans' associations on the 11 November, but in 1921 the French government became concerned that these ceremonies were impacting on industrial productivity and moved the commemoration to the first available Sunday. Following protests, a national French holiday was declared in 1922. The ceremonies were heavily influenced by the state, with national and local officials playing an important part, and there was an expectation of universal national participation. Attendees would march, often from the local church, past the local cemeteries to a relevant memorial; tricolour flags, black wreaths and wreaths of flowers would be placed on or around the memorials, but unlike Britain there was almost no military symbolism involved in the ceremony. Up to a hundred names of the dead would then be read out, typically by a war orphan, and the crowd would follow each name by saying "Mort pour la France"—"He died for France"—in unison.

Other important days were commemorated at memorials around the world. Australia commemorated Armistice Day, but held larger scale commemorations around Anzac Day on 25 April. Anzac Day was founded to remember the Gallipoli campaign, and memorials were erected for the first ceremonies in 1916; dawn services at local memorials formed a key part of the national event. In France, the authorities in Verdun organised the Fêtes de la Victoire on 23 June, centring on the city's memorials and the nearby ossuary. These usually involved senior French military figures and pageantry. Ceremonies to honour the fallen of the battle of the Somme were held by the British at the Somme memorials on the Sunday nearest 1 July throughout the 1920s and 1930s. Romania – inter-war years, the Feast of the Ascension used to commemorate the war dead. Termed Heroes' Day, civic processions under central guidance from the Societata took place to the local war memorials. The 6 August was also used to commemorate the battle of Mărăşeşti at the site. Many of these adopted the British use of collective silence during the memorial ceremonies.

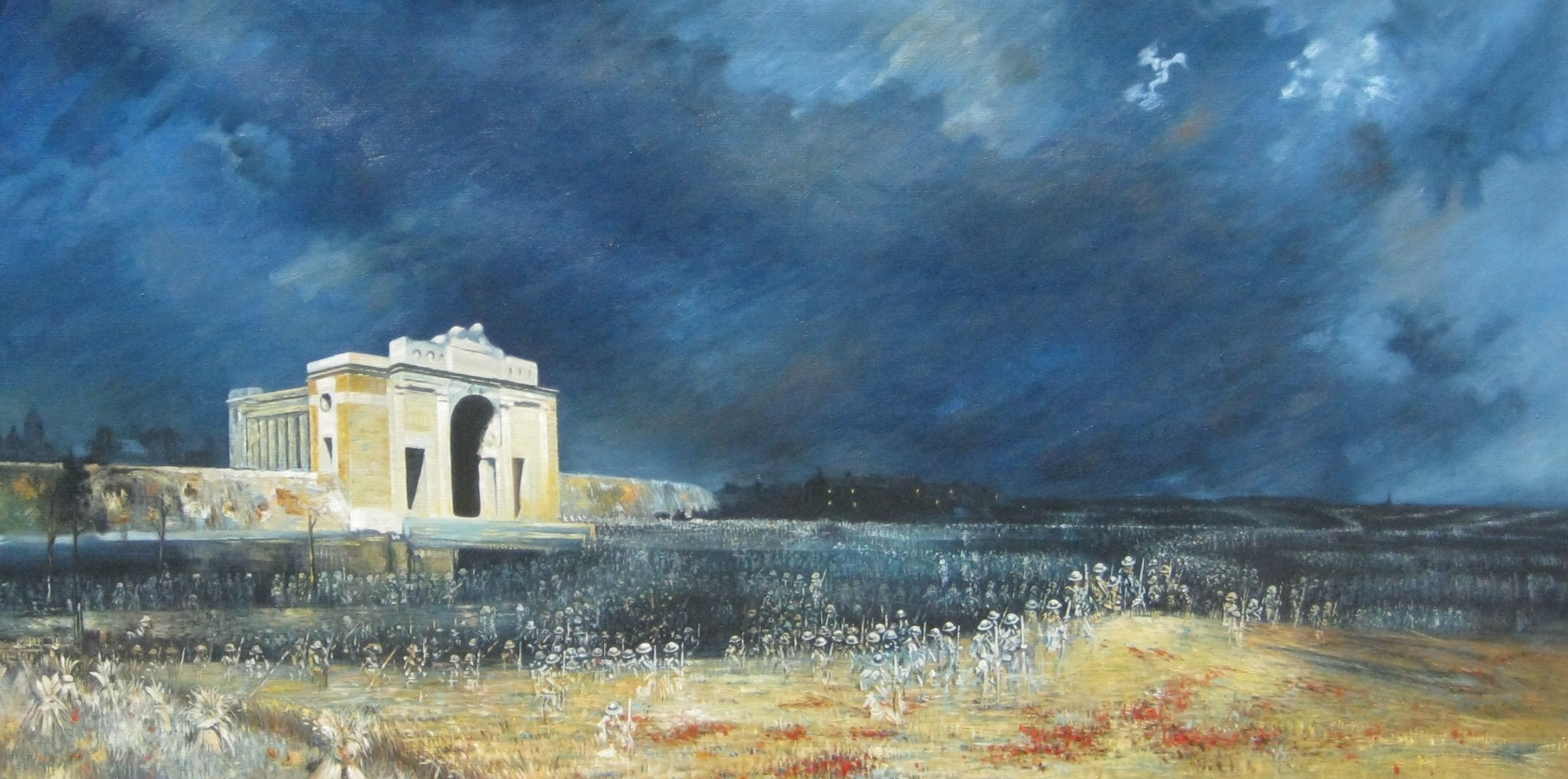
The Menin Gate at Midnight by Will Longstaff, showing the dead passing through the Menin Gate

In some locations, these ceremonies could prove controversial. Canadian ceremonies on Armistice Day in the 1920s were not straightforward. In Montreal they were predominantly Anglican and English, with French and Catholic elements largely excluded until the end. The opening of the Vimy Memorial drew criticism for its secular nature—no clergy were invited to speak-despite the religious symbolism of much of the building.

The emotional character of the ceremonies around the memorials changed as grieving took place and many individuals, inevitably, continued with their lives. Some early ceremonies around memorials were believed to be closely associated with spiritual events. (Note: Spiritualism had begun markedly more popular in the 1920s as a result of World War I.) The opening of the Menin Gate memorial, for example, inspired Will Longstaff's dream that led to the famous Menin Gate at Midnight painting, portraying the fallen dead rising and walking through the gateway, while the Cenotaph ceremonies were photographed in 1922, and believed by some to show the ghosts of the war dead. Indeed, early ceremonies at the London Cenotaph after the war were felt to be particularly emotional; commentators felt that by the late 1920s, the events were more formal and less fraught with emotional than previously. Initially foreign diplomats in Britain were expected to lay wreaths on Armistice Day; this requirement was reviewed in the 1930s. In Australia, there were initially many local ceremonies at memorials on Anzac Day specifically for bereaved mothers; by the 1930s, these had been discontinued and incorporated into the wider ceremonial occasion.

==== Pilgrimages ====
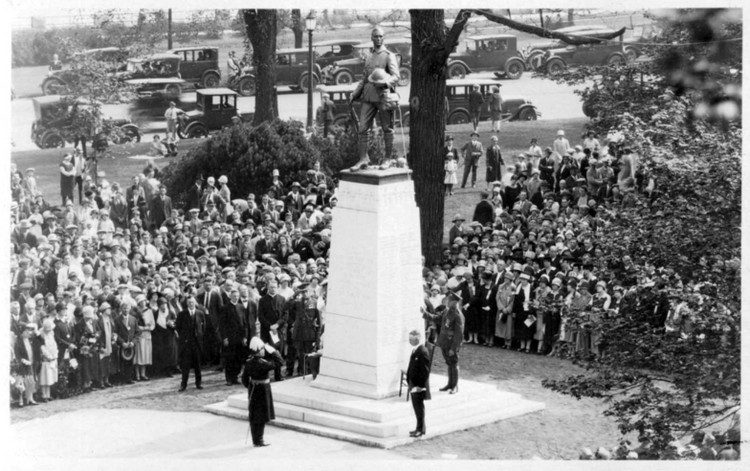
The unveiling of the memorial at Niagara Falls, Ontario in 1927, subsequently published as a postcard

Organised or structured visits to war memorials became popular during the inter-war years. These were often termed pilgrimages, in keeping with the spiritual and religious nature of the journeys. These were frequently combined with other ceremonies at the sites. Tensions existed between those who travelled to the sites as tourists and those who perceived themselves as pilgrims.

Along the Western front these began quite early after the war and continued for several decades, dropping in number in the mid-1920s, when interest in the war temporarily diminished, and again in the Great Depression years of the early 1930s. Flemish pilgrimages to Belgium graves, particularly the heldenhuldezerkjes, and memorials began in 1919, continuing through the subsequent decades. The Ossuary at Verdun was the centre for many veterans pilgrimages in the 1920s, one of the better known groups being the Fêtes de la Bataille, which travelled to the site to undertake a vigil, processions and lay wreaths. These pilgrimages were typically low-key and avoided military symbolism or paraphernalia. Ypres became a pilgrimage destination for Britons to imagine and share the sufferings of their men and gain a spiritual benefit; the Ypres League was established by veterans, and sought to transform the horrors of trench warfare into a purifying spiritual quest. The Menin Gate memorial became a focal point for British pilgrims to the Western front after it was opened in 1927. Pilgrims could come long distances: in the 1920s Canadians began to journey to Vimy and Australians began visiting Gallipoli from 1925 onwards, bringing back military souvenirs relics.

Guidebooks for English-speaking visitors became common, including a number of official publications, some extremely detailed. Major Dwight D. Eisenhower spent years working on a guide to American battlefields. A 1920 British guide book, The Holy Ground of British Arms captured the mood of the Ypres League, stating: "there is not a single half-acre in Ypres that is not sacred. There is not a single stone which has not sheltered scores of loyal young hearts, whose one impulse and desire was to fight and, if need be, to die for England."

In central and eastern Europe, the state played a greater role in organising these pilgrimages. The National Orthodox Romanian Women's Society, supported by the church and the state, played an important part in enabling regular pilgrimages to important Romanian sites up until 1939. In Germany and Italy, the Fascist governments took a keen interest in organising such journeys. In Italy, these involved large, state-influenced organisations, and the government steadily discouraged private visits or unofficial groups from taking part in alternative ceremonies at these sites. In Nazi Germany, pilgrimages were organised to the new war memorials sponsored by the government in the 1930s.

=== Politics ===
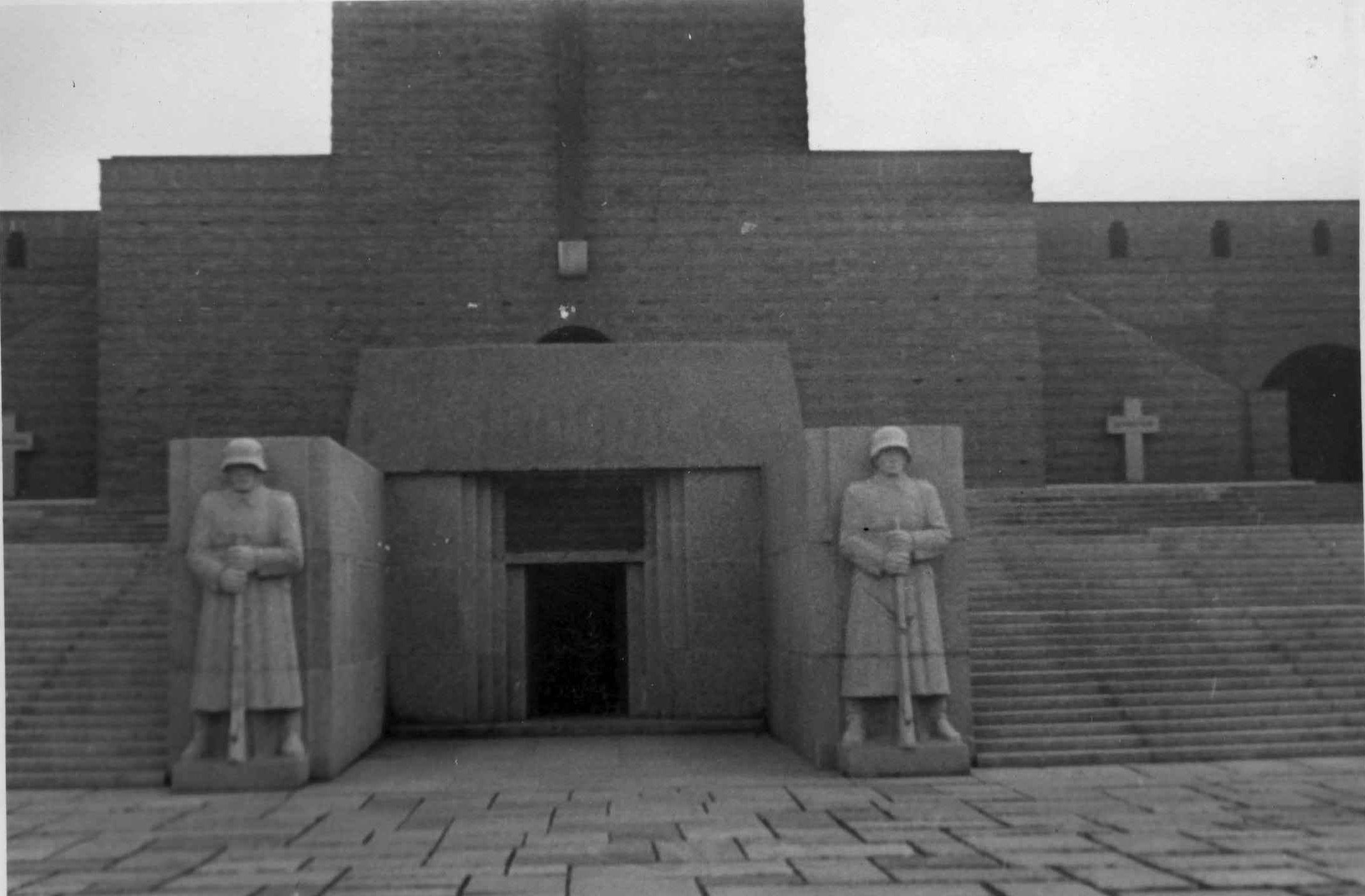
The Tannenberg Memorial, Germany's Tomb of the Unknown Soldier

The memorials to World War I were frequently politicised, either by the debates over their construction and design, or by the symbolism incorporated into them. Even where attempts were made to ensure political neutrality, as in France where the inscriptions on memorials were usually deliberately neutral, avoiding political controversy, national politics influenced the symbolism and messages incorporated into the memorials.

Pacifism slowly began to emerge after the war, but very few war memorials communicated a pacifist message, largely because in the 1920s, most in the victorious countries felt that the war, while costly in human life, had been worth fighting. Anti-war protests in the inter-war years did use war memorials, however, as locations to communicate their messages; the Communist party in France, for example, held rallies at them. In Britain, political views about the war influenced attitudes towards memorial design and the ceremonies that surrounded them. Those who supported the war were keen to see the ideals of justice and freedom embodied in the designs; those who opposed the conflict sought memorials that would convince people to avoid future slaughter. The opening of the tomb of the Unknown Soldier was criticised for what anti-war campaigners felt was its pro-war pomp and ceremony, and the burial of the Unknown Soldier in Westminster raised controversy between those who liked the ceremony, and those who thought that the pageantry was designed to distract from the poor living conditions faced by the survivors of the war.

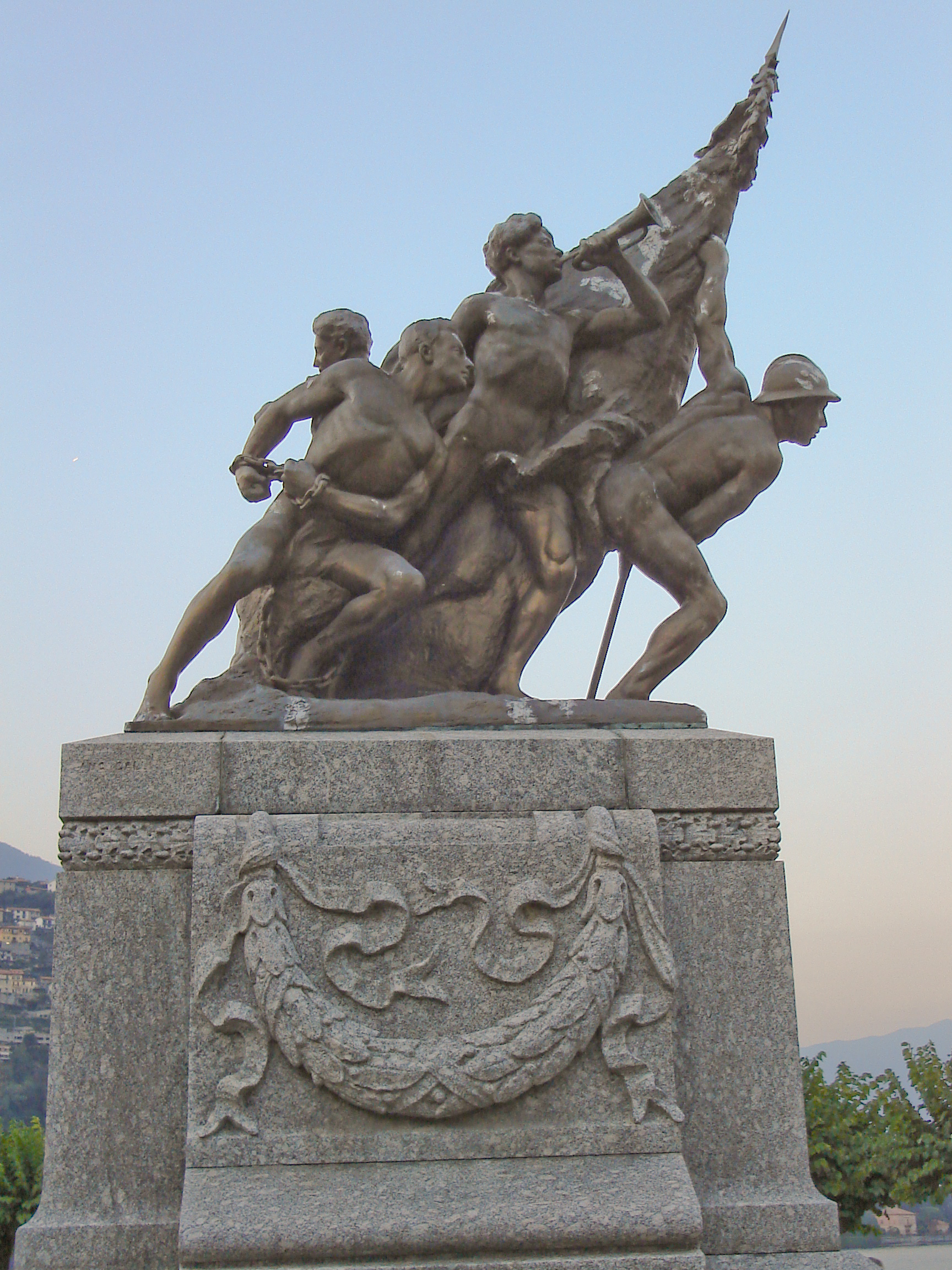
Memorial in Cernobbio, Italy

Religious differences and tensions could make it difficult to design inclusive war memorials. In US, the separation of church and state meant that crosses were discouraged. Despite being banned from onwards 1905, many French monuments were explicitly Catholic in character, including a Catholic cross. Australia also minimised the use of crosses, partially for similar reasons, but also because over concerns about excluding their Jewish community. Decisions to incorporate Christian imagery into memorials in Britain could also exclude minority groups, such as Jews, from participating in a memorial. In Britain, the religious differences between Anglicans, Nonconformists and Roman Catholics were frequently played out at a local level in arguments over the location and symbolism to be used in memorials. In Canada, where these differences were overlaid across the English and French speaking national divide, war memorials attempted to reunify the country; the Cross of Sacrifice memorial in Montreal, for example, was deliberately situated in between the Catholic and Protestant war cemeteries. This was only partially successful – inauguration ceremony and the military parade resulted in shouted arguments between French and English speaking parts of the crowd.

World War I memorials were also involved in the civil wars and ethnic disputes of the inter-war period. After independence and the civil war, for example, the Republic of Ireland did not prioritise commemorating the dead of World War I, and indeed the events were largely ignored. Attempts to construct memorials during the 1930s, such as the National War Memorial Gardens in Dublin, were discouraged by the Republican movement and finally blocked altogether in 1939. By contrast, Unionists in Northern Ireland made the war a key part of their political narrative, emphasising their role in events such as the Battle of the Somme. Monuments were erected in prominent locations in the centres of key Northern Ireland cities.

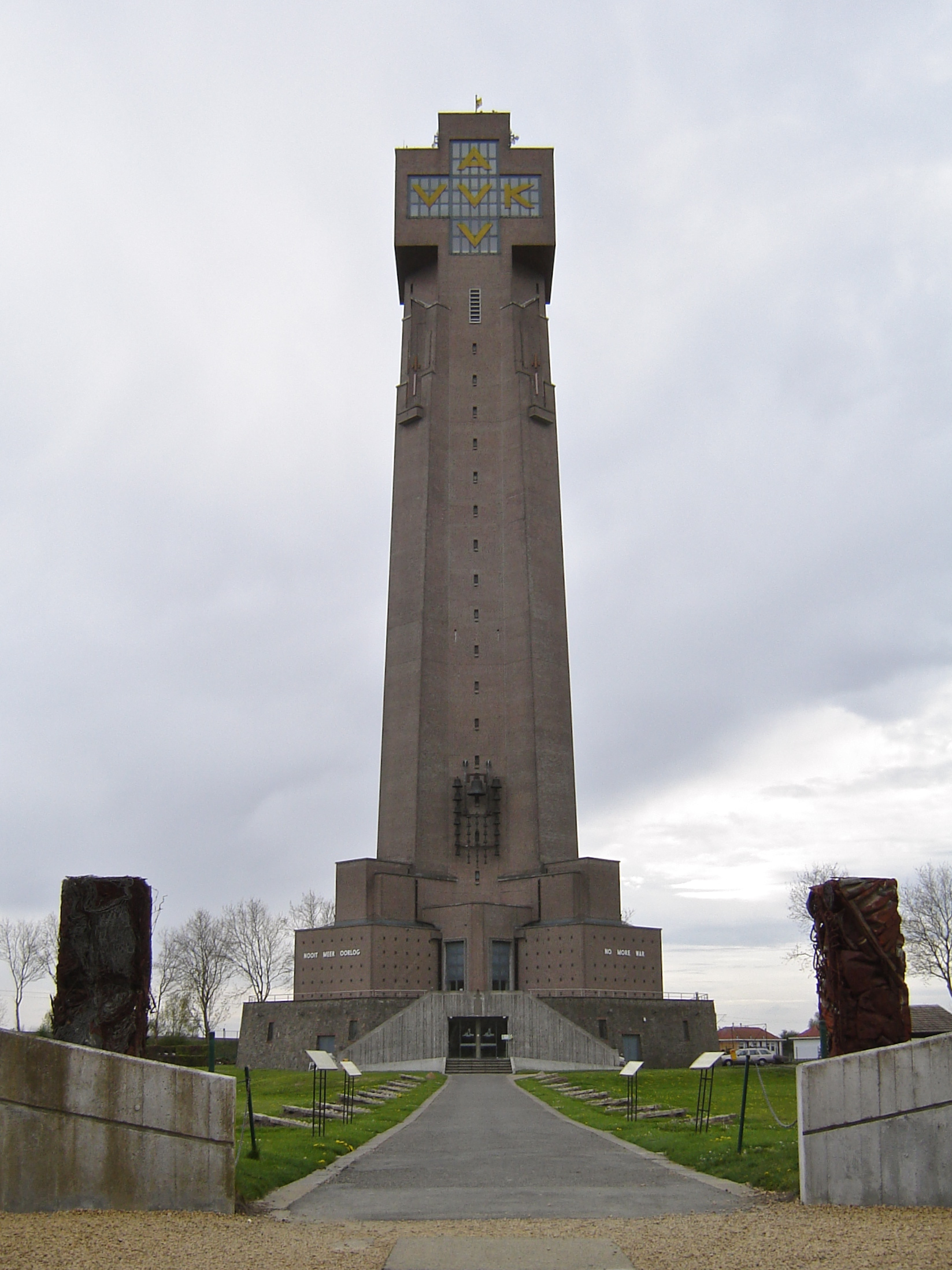
The rebuilt Flemish IJzertoren tower

Other multi-ethnic parts of Europe frequently found war memorials equally contentious. In Flanders, the IJzertoren, a controversial Flemish memorial tower, was opened in 1930, commemorating the sacrifices during the war, but also celebrating Flemish identity and marking the hard treatment of Flemish activists by the Belgian authorities during the conflict. In disputed multi-ethnic territories in the east, such as Transylvania, the war had created bitter memories between Hungarian and Romanian inhabitants. The arguments were played out in differences as to how the dates of the war-in which Hungary and Romania had entered and left at different times-were recorded on tombstones and other memorials. In Serbia, the Kosovo Maiden was extensively used in war memorials, drawing a link between the war and the Battle of Kosovo.

The Fascist movements in Italy and Germany in the 1920s and 1930s made extensive use of World War I memorials to communicate a political message. War memorials were a key part of the Italian Fascist government's programme, with memorials set up in the name of the fallen and the Fascist revolution. Local Fascist organisations made extensive use of the war memorials and associated ceremonies to promote loyalty both to Italy, and to the revolution. The government promoted the "cult of the fallen hero", stressing that the war dead had played a vital role in transforming Italy's position in Europe and transforming history. The Fascist leader Mussolini was less enthusiastic, however, about the Tomb of the Unknown Soldier, which he felt was associated with the former regime; he discouraged its use, although remained sensitive to its symbolic importance to various parts of Italian society. Military fly-pasts were added to the Armistice ceremonies and the Tomb itself was moved in 1935, to make it easier to use the memorial in military parades.

The later German monuments constructed by the Nazi government were substantial, but communicated a limited range of symbolic messages, focusing on German heroism, conservative nationalism sentiments and masculinity. Use of mass graves symbolised the sense of German community. When Paul von Hindenburg died in 1935, the Tannenberg Memorial was then used as his mausoleum, commemorating elite military leadership during the war. The Nazi government attempted to have the Jewish names removed from the war memorials, but this proved impractical and instead a law was passed forbidding their addition to any future memorials. The government also removed more experimental earlier war memorials which were felt to communicate an inappropriate message about the war, such as the work of Ernst Barlach.

=== Architecture ===
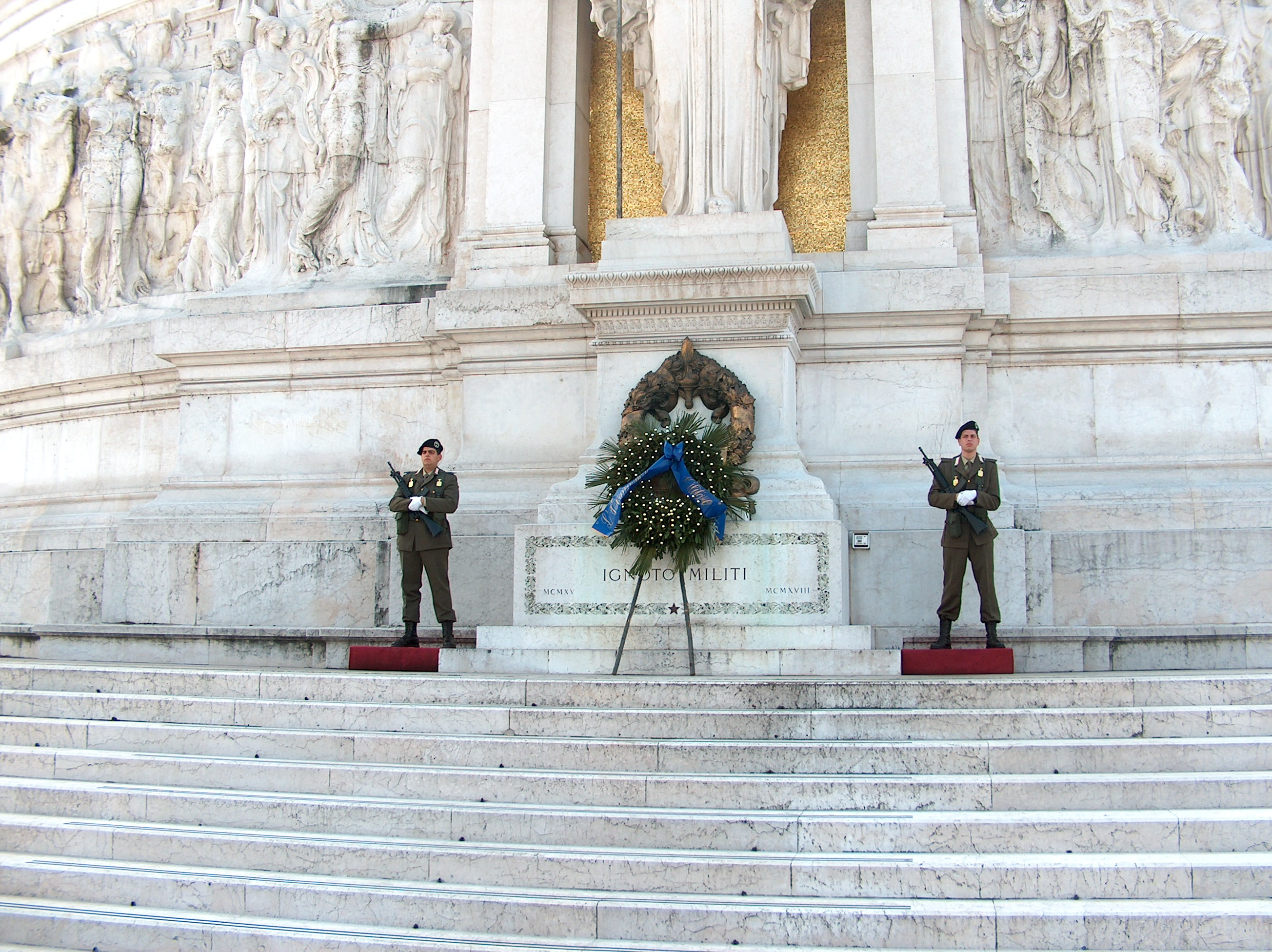
The Tomb of the Unknown Soldier, Italy

Most World War I war designers attempted to produce memorials that were, as cultural historian Jay Winter describes, noble, uplifting, tragic and endurably sad. There were various architectural styles used on memorials, but most were essentially conservative in nature, typically embracing well-established styles such as classicism and embracing mainstream Christian symbolism. This conservatism in part resulted from the age and background of the committees that were commissioning the memorials, and also from a sense that established architectural styles, rather a potentially more transitory but fashionable style, would be more enduring and appropriate.

Professional concern was raised in several countries about the quality of memorials. Australians expressed critical concern from 1919 onwards about the poor quality of the sculptures of soldiers on memorials, the blame being placed on the cheap reproductions by stone masons. Their government responded by establishing advisory boards to discourage this trend. Britain also saw concerns over the "stereotyped designs" being supplied by firms of stone masons, and here again numerous bodies issued guidance on better practices, including the Royal Academy of Art, the Church of England; the Civic Arts Association was formed specifically to help. The opinion of professional artists and critics remained quite important for committees when choosing designs, however, and there was vigorous discussion between supporters of different styles and architectural traditions.

Many designers were involved in the construction of memorials, but some became particularly well known for their work in this area. Many of the sculptors active on the memorials were established, Victorian-era individuals; the war had disrupted the training of a new generation, and many young sculptors had been killed. Some attempts were made to give preference to designers who had fought in the war, but this was far from universal. In British circles, Edwin Lutyens, Herbert Baker, Reginald Blomfield and Charles Holden formed the core of the established artists; these were joined by Charles Sargeant Jagger, Gilbert Ledward and Eric Gill from the younger generation. Pietro Porcelli was a particularly prolific Australian designer. In Germany, Käthe Kollwitz's memorial of a grieving mother at the Roggevelde cemetery was particularly famous, and based on her own loss of a son during the fighting in the war.

==== Symbolism ====
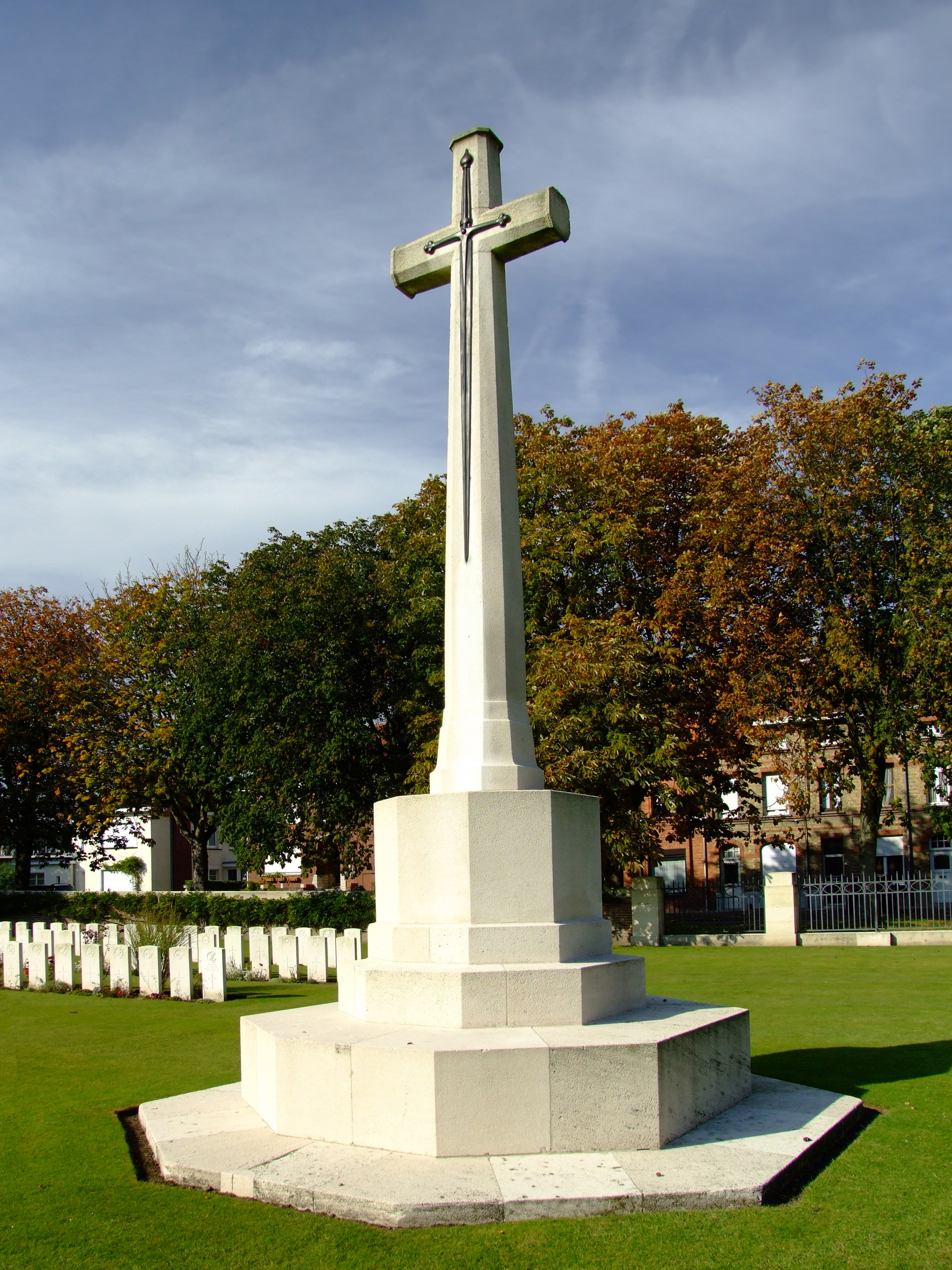
Sir Reginald Blomfield's widely used Cross of Sacrifice

World War I memorials made extensive use of symbolism and allegory. Some of these symbols were national in character, carrying a simple message about national victory – a Gallic rooster triumphing over a German, the Croix de Guerre, or the Romanians' symbol for their heroes' cult for example – but others, such as images of infantrymen, could be used in different ways, depending on how they were portrayed. Some sculpture of French infantrymen, for example, aims to capture the spirit of French republicanism, while others are designed with more right-wing, nationalist attributes.

Major memorial themes, such as victory and death all had their symbols. Many Canadian and British soldiers are shown raising a hat or a rifle, a sign of victory first introduced into Boer War memorials. The Greek goddess Nike herself frequently appears on civic memorials, particularly in Britain and Canada, personifying victory, often pointing the way to soldiers: the image is far less common, however, on more sombre memorials in battlefields and graveyards. Personifications of Death rarely feature on these memorials, however, probably because the emphasis is typically on the self-sacrifice of the soldiers involved, rather than their being taken or claimed by Death. Death is more typically presented through images of widows, orphans and elderly parents on memorials, all popular inter-war allegorical forms for death and grieving. Figures of women often represented peace, civilisation or wider humanity.

By far the most important source of symbolism on memorials, however, is Christian imagery and icons. Religious imagery permeated many war memorials, even the secular. The most important of these symbols was the Christian cross, a widely used symbol of hope and suffering. (Note: In countries such as England, the cross had only recently been considered unsuitable for displays because of its Roman Catholic connotations.) The cross could take multiple forms, from Catholic designs in France, to Orthodox crosses in eastern Europe. Celtic crosses were popular in Britain and Ireland, partially because they avoided Catholic connotations, although they were considered vulgar by more classical architects such as Blomfield. In France, les croix des bois, wooden crosses, became popular symbols at memorials after Roland Dorgelès's novel of the same name. German memorials made extensive use of the image of the Virgin Mary tending her son Christ, following in the tradition of the pietà. The crucifixion was also a widely used symbol, as seen in Derwent Wood's Canada's Golgotha, although Christ himself was relatively rarely typically seen on British memorials.

The widespread use of Christian symbolism led to questions about how to produce memorials suitable for non-Christians. Lutyens attempted to solve this problem for the IWGC through the design of the Stone of Remembrance, or War Stone. This was a large, simple stone, intended to resemble an altar and evoke the theme of sacrifice. In practice, many commentators felt it resembled a sarcophagus. Lutyens wanted it to avoid conventional Christian symbolism and based it on designs in Chinese Ming tombs. One of Lutyens' arguments in favour of his design was that explicit Christian symbolism excluded the Indian and Jewish communities and atheists. The IWGC designs for the Indian and Chinese war cemeteries in Europe deliberately did not use Christian imagery – although, as historian Xu Guoqi notes, the Chinese role in the Allied armies remains largely uncommemorated through memorials.

==== Classicism ====
Many memorials drew on a classical style of architecture to produce their effect. This had been a popular style for many pre-war memorials, such as those for the dead of the Boer War, and used Greek or Roman structures, styles and symbolism. A key feature of the classical style was the concept of the "beautiful death" – classical memorials might include figures of soldiers, sometimes dying in conflict, but always heroically and, ultimately, peacefully. Soldiers in these memorials were still frequently depicted as Homeric warriors, rather than more realist figures. The classical symbolism was often used to distance the event of death from the observer, appealing to allegories for sacrifice, justice and victory, in an attempt to make mourning easier to bear.

Some inter-war architects developed this approach further. Some traditional classical memorials had been criticised in both England and Germany as being fussy and overly ornate. Men such as Lutyens took the classical principles, but simplified them until the design became almost abstract. These memorials used abstract, beautiful designs intended to remove the viewer from the real world, and focus them on an idealised sense of self-sacrifice, a continuation of the principle of a "beautiful death". In many ways the simplified, but still classical, forms of memorials like the Cenotaph meant that mourners could read their own thoughts and concerns onto the memorial. Where dead soldiers were shown, they were depicted in an image of serenity and peace, often physically distanced from the viewer on a high platform, the entire effect reflected by the silence that traditionally surrounds ceremonies at the Cenotaph.

Many classical themes were used in this way. Thiepval Memorial, for example uses the classical themes of a victory arch and an abstract pattern of diminishing arches to produce what historian Jay Winter has termed "an embodiment of nothing". The various Cenotaphs adopt the principle of entasis – Greek method with apparently straight lines, that are in fact slightly curved. Many memorials and war cemeteries used precinct walls to mark out the memorial as special and sacred, originally a Roman feature made popular again in the 19th century. Some features were more literally interpreted: the Victoria State Memorial in Australia, for example, was closely based on a Persian step pyramid.

Classical themes, like Christian symbolism, emphasised the sacred nature of the memorial sites. Nonetheless, there was some criticism of classicism by those who wanted a clearer separation of pagan and Christian symbolism; this was played out in arguments in Germany over whether Iron Crosses or traditional Christian crosses should be used on memorials. Similarly, Lutyens' War Stones were criticised for their blending of Christian and non-Christian design, while the London Cenotaph was critiqued by the Catholic Herald as being "insulting to Christianity". Some Christian symbols were redesigned in the simplified classical style, however, including the Cross of Sacrifice. This cross, in a classical style and featuring a white cross and an inverted bronze sword, was designed by Sir Reginald Blomfield for the War Graves Commission, widely used in Commonwealth countries. The design was criticised by some who felt that it excluded other faiths from the memorial site, but nonetheless, over a 1,000 of these crosses were ultimately built.

==== Medievalism ====
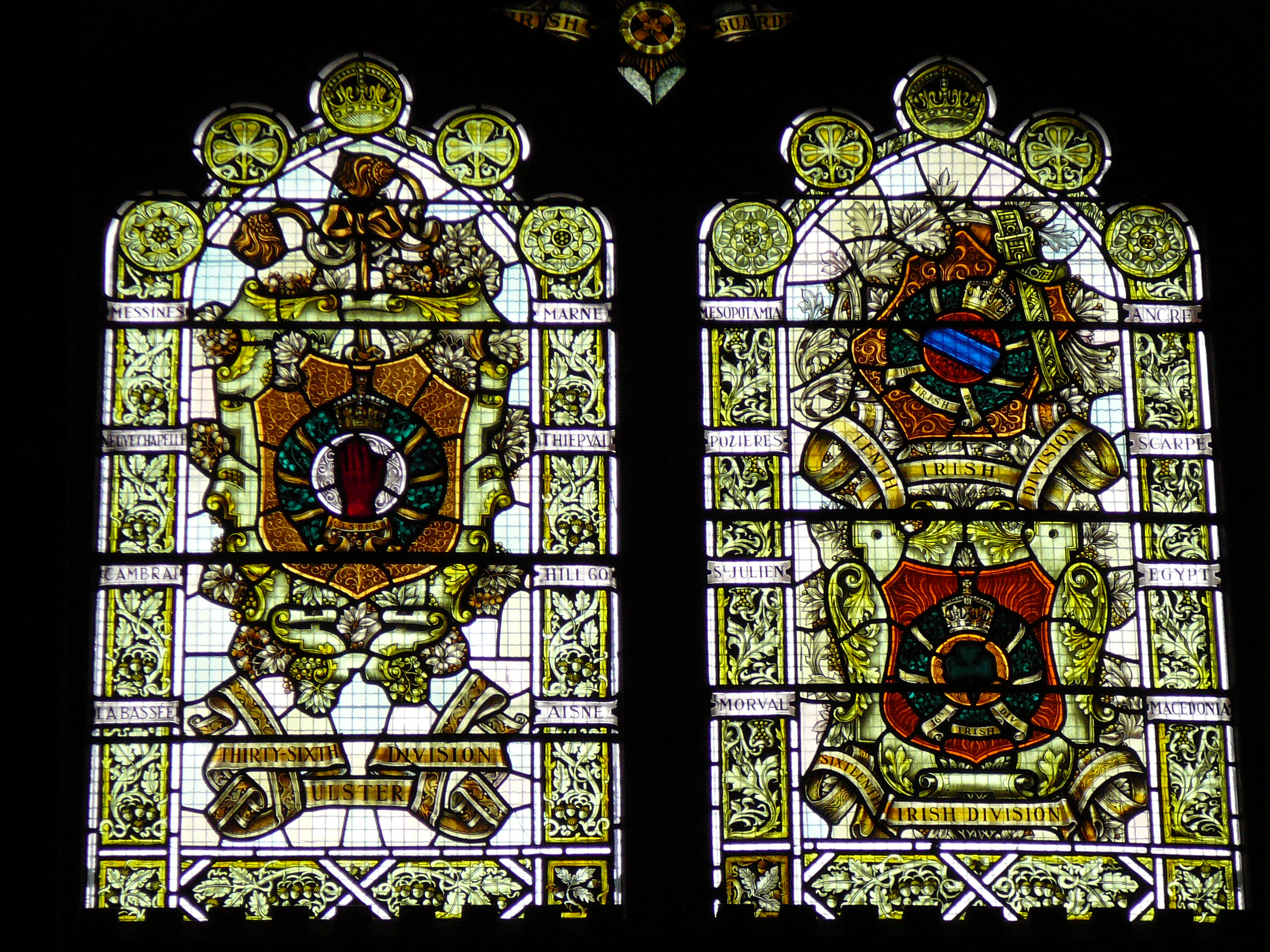
Medieval styled memorial window in Derry, featuring the Red Hand of Ulster as part of the arms of the 36th (Ulster) Division (l)

In some countries, particularly Germany and England, memorials used a medieval style, reaching back to a more distant past. Some of these medieval styled memorials were set in existing medieval buildings, fusing older and newer themes. Memorial church windows, for example, could combine medieval and modern features, including armoured knights on horseback, modern weapons-including-tanks and aircraft-and modern national flags. Other memorials deliberately chose medieval themes and symbols, such as the Tomb of the Unknown Warrior in Westminster, where the language of the inscriptions was deliberately archaic, and the tomb itself made from a medieval chest, decorated with a crusader's sword. England's patron saint, Saint George, was a particular popular symbol in British designs, typically shown mounted and wearing armour. The Arthurian Round Table and the medieval crusades proved popular themes in Canadian memorials.

New memorial buildings could also adopt a medieval style. The Scottish National War Memorial, for example, a Scots baronial styled memorial hall complete with stained glass in Edinburgh Castle, attempts to blend in with the surrounding medieval fortress. In Germany, the totenburgen usually looked to the past for their style; Tannenberg, for example, was heavily medieval in appearance, resembling a castle, albeit combined with a huge cross and mass graves. The dolmen boulders used around the outside of many German memorials reinforced the archaic feel of the monuments. In other cases Germans chose to preserve or rebuild real medieval buildings and architecture to form war memorials, such as parts of Dorsten and Dülken.

Medievalism was popular with mourners because it reached back to the past, attempting to heal some of the discontinuities and ruptures of the war. In a period of great uncertainty, the style was reaffirming and apparently immutable, lost in a distant past. By placing the recent dead alongside those who had fallen before, the style gave reassurance that the World War I dead would not be forgotten; in Westminster, the Dean of Westminster, emphasised when he noted that the Unknown Warrior would be resting alongside his "Saxon and Norman, Plantagenet and Tudor" predecessors. The style was actively promoted by a number of extant artistic and architectural institutions and groups, such as the Victoria and Albert Museum, the Arts and Crafts Movement and Gothic revivalists.

==== Alternative styles ====
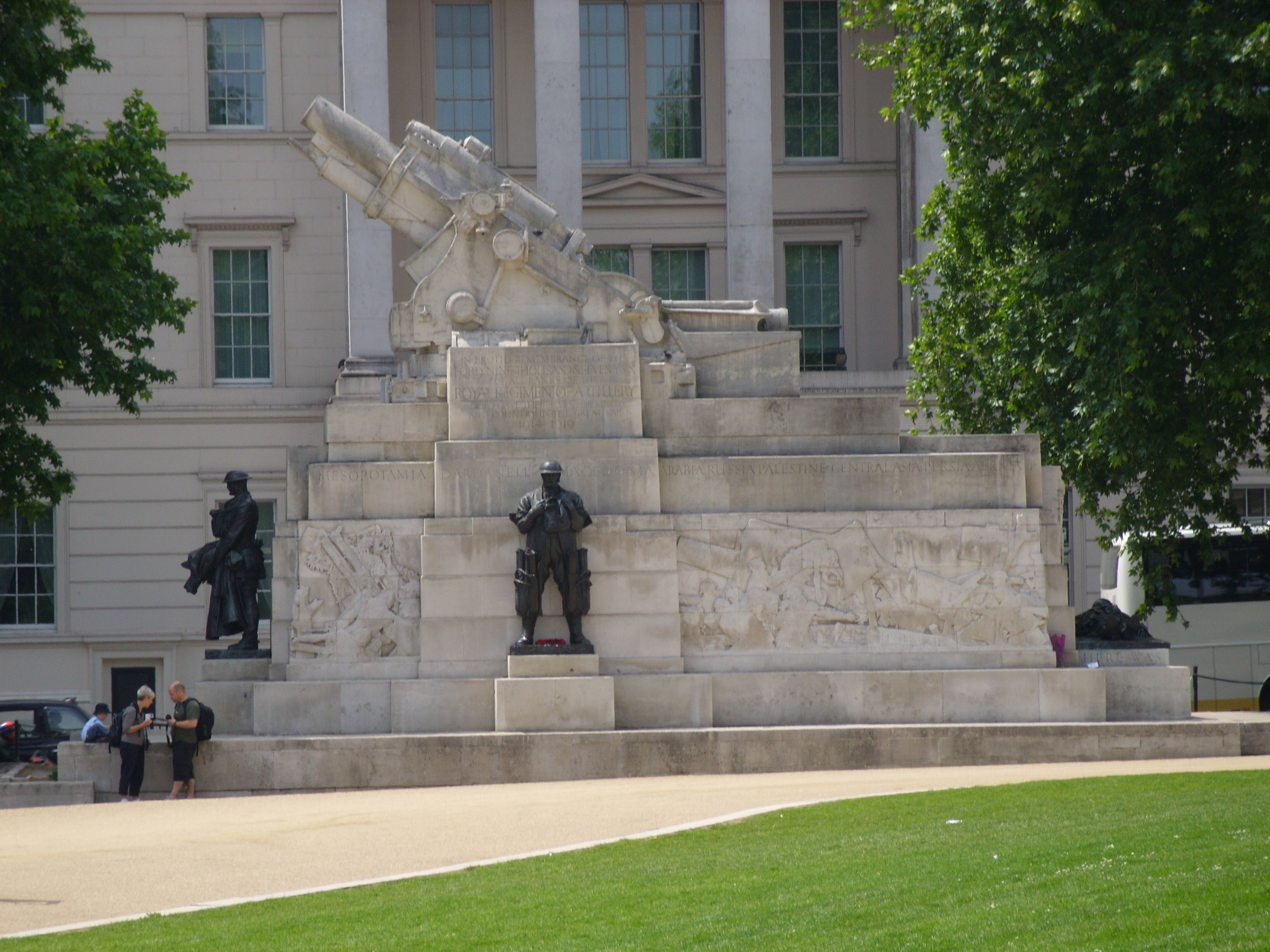
The Royal Artillery Memorial in London, featuring an oversized stone replica of a BL 9.2 inch Mk I howitzer

Only a minority of war memorials used some of the newer styles emerging in the inter-war period, such as modernism, realist and Art Nouveau approaches. As noted above, typically existing, traditional themes were preferred for memorials as a way of grounding mourning in a more familiar perspective. Nonetheless, some of the memorials to use the newer styles became particularly famous. There are a handful of memorials conducted in an Art Deco style, including the ANZAC War Memorial in Sydney which uses the delicate aspects of the Art Deco style to invoke sadness in the viewer, and is the only war memorial in the world to depict a naked soldier. The Douaumont Ossuary also draws on Art Deco principles in its structural architecture, avoiding straight lines in favour of gentle, soft, intersecting curves. Modernist principles were taken further in a small number of British memorials designed by Eric Gill, characterised by their highly abstract, simplified forms.

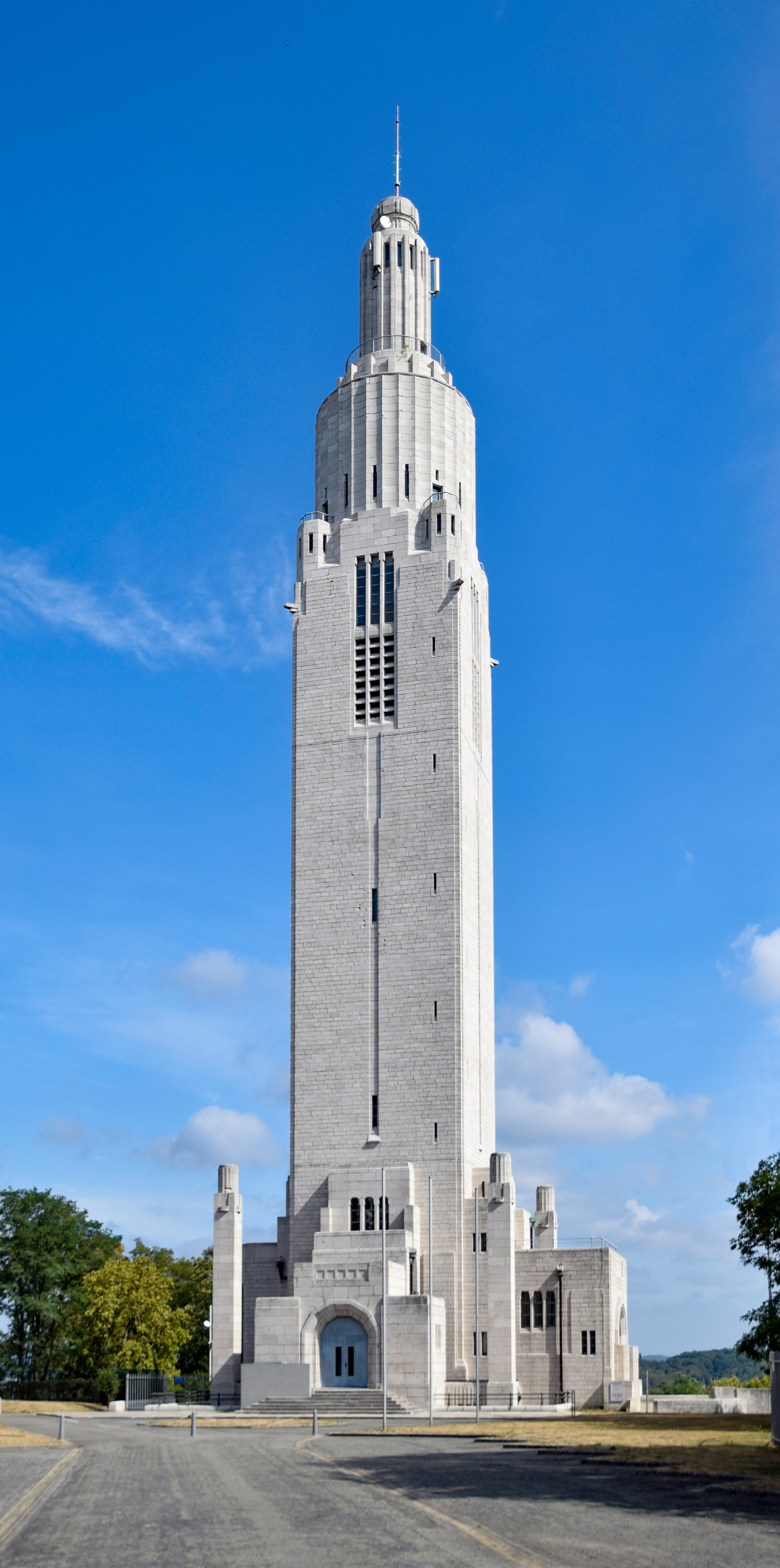
Tower of the Interallied Memorial of Cointe, Liège, Belgium

Realism and early modernist principles were applied in Britain to produce a critique of the conventional classical approach and the concept of a "beautiful death", most notably by Charles Jagger. Jagger's later work during the inter-war period, most notably his Royal Artillery Memorial, uses realism techniques to portray an oversized BL 9.2 inch Mk I howitzer in detail, mounted on a huge, architecturally simple plinth with detailed carvings of military events involving ordinary artillerymen. The sheer size of the piece creates a dehumanizing impact, despite the portrayal of a team of artillerymen, including a covered corpse. Critiqued by much of the British press when unveiled in 1925, many veterans however felt that the style connected to them in a way that more classical themes could not. While the Royal Artillery Memorial is unique, elements of the style can be seen in some other memorials, such as the Cameronians Memorial which includes a realist, almost tactile depiction of a machine gun position.

Historical accuracy was important to many British designers, resulting in the use of genuine military equipment as models for memorials, and long discussions with committees over the details to be incorporated into designs. In contrast, the British interest in accurately depicting real weaponry from the war was far less common on German monuments, where usually stylised medieval weapons and armour were used.

== World War II and post-war ==
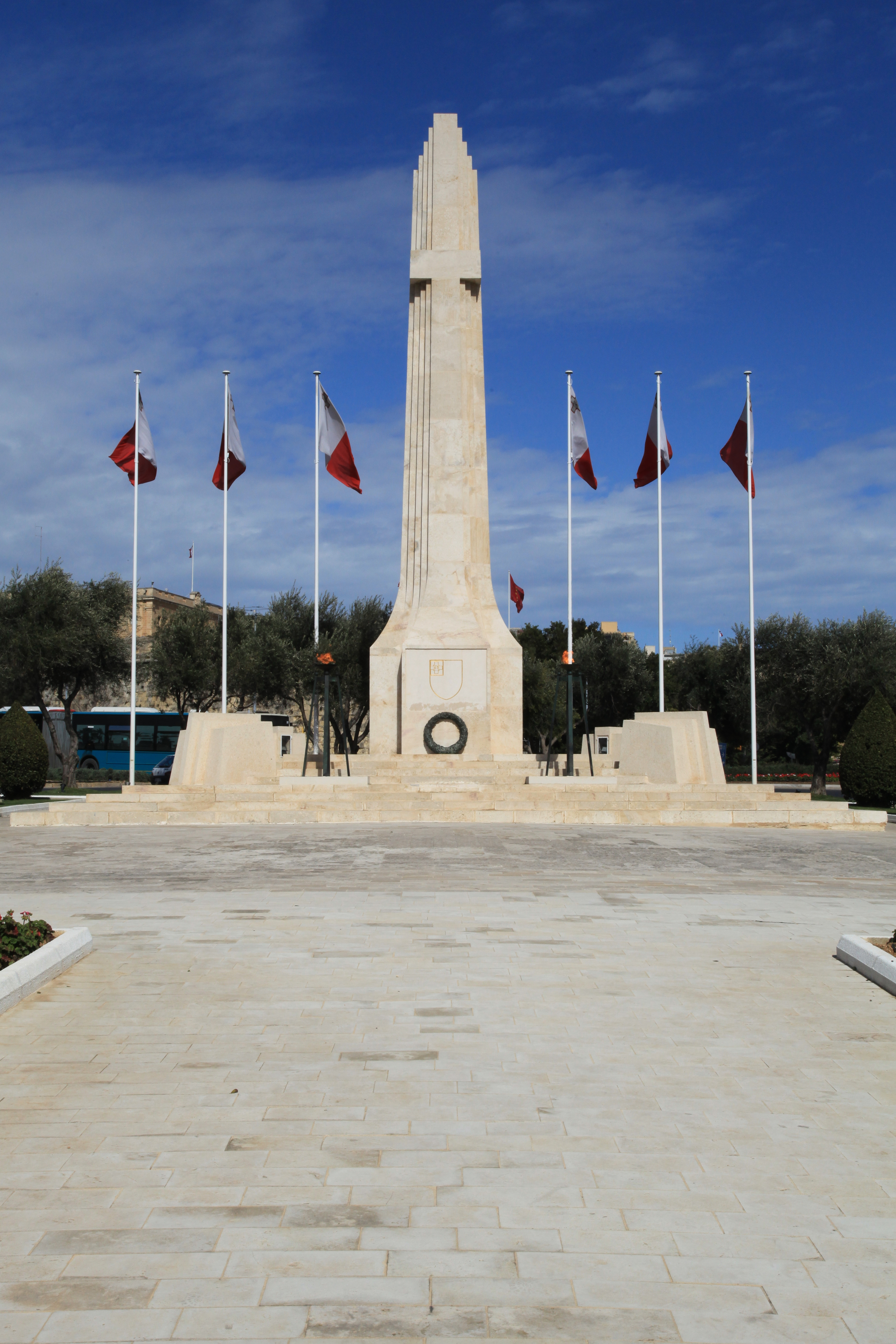
The War Memorial in Floriana, Malta was built in 1938 commemorating the dead of World War I. In 1949 it was rededicated to commemorate the fallen of both world wars.

The Second World War that broke out in 1939 consumed the attention of a new generation. Across most of the theatres of conflict, the participants attempted to respect the memorials to World War I. After the Second World War there was no equivalent mass construction of memorials to the war dead; instead, often local World War I memorials were adapted for use instead: additional names might be inscribed to the existing lists. In some cases, this resulted in memorials losing their exclusive focus on World War I. The Tomb of the Unknown Soldier in Washington, for example, was expanded in 1950s to include corpses from the Second World War and Korea War, broadening the memorial's remit to commemorate most modern wars. In other cases, such as the Australian War Memorial, begun in the inter-war years but only opened in 1941, an essentially new memorial was formed to honour the multiple conflicts.

In Italy and Germany, 1945 saw the collapse of Fascism; many memorials in Italian towns and cities were used to execute and display the bodies of the overthrown regime, and the inter-war Fascist pilgrimages and ceremonies around the memorials were abandoned and quickly forgotten. The World War I memorial sites continued to be used, but a combination of anti-war feelings and their residual Fascist links limited the attendance at their public ceremonies. Due to the changes in national borders, in the post-war era some sites favoured by the Nazi government, such as the Tannenberg Memorial, found themselves in Poland; the demolition of Tannenberg began in 1949 and its stonework was reused for Soviet party buildings.

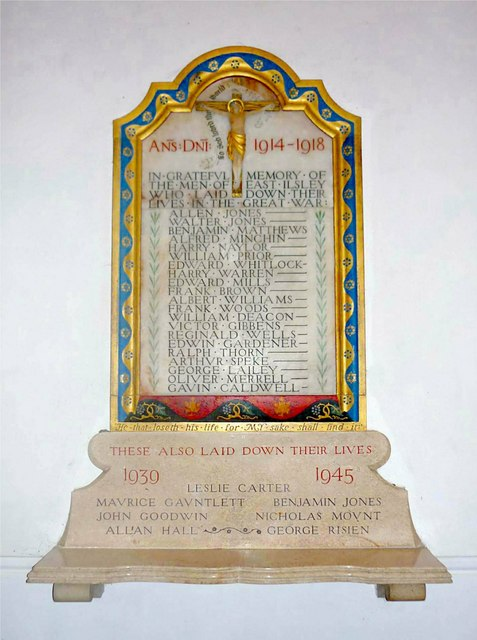
War memorial in East Ilsley, restored in 2008, and featuring combined original list of World War I and later World War II names

Elsewhere, changes in post-war politics impacted considerably on the memorials. in Belgium, the Flemish IJzertoren tower had become associated with Fascism during the Second World War and was blown up in 1946 by anti-Flemish activists, leading to outrage. Proposals were put forward to build a national monument on the site, but ultimately a second Flemish memorial was constructed instead. In Romania, the Communist post-war government moved away from commemorations around Ascension Day, which was seen as carrying too many religious meanings. The Romanian Societata itself was abolished in 1948, pilgrimages to the memorials ceased and the focus of the Communist government was almost entirely placed on commemorating the sacrifices of the Soviet army during World War II. Unusually, political changes in Canada led to the construction of new World War I memorials; some of the inter-war tensions eased, and 35 new memorials were added in Quebec to the existing 68 in the post-war years, often built as combined memorials to later conflicts.

As a whole, interest in the war memorials diminished considerably in the 1950s and 1960s, reflected in a reduced level of ceremonies and a simplification of the commemorative events around memorials. In the post-war years, for example, the separate official and veterans ceremonies at the Verdun memorials blended into one; in 1956, German and French ceremonies were also united into a single event. Attendance at events like Anzac Day diminished. Many memorials slowly deteriorated: in some cases the original inter-war funding had never included maintenance, in other cases the materials used to construct the memorials were not durable. In some towns and cities, the memorials were moved to less prominent locations as part of urban renewal projects, or hidden by new buildings. World War I memorials were commonplace in many countries and were paid little attention.

== Since 1990 ==
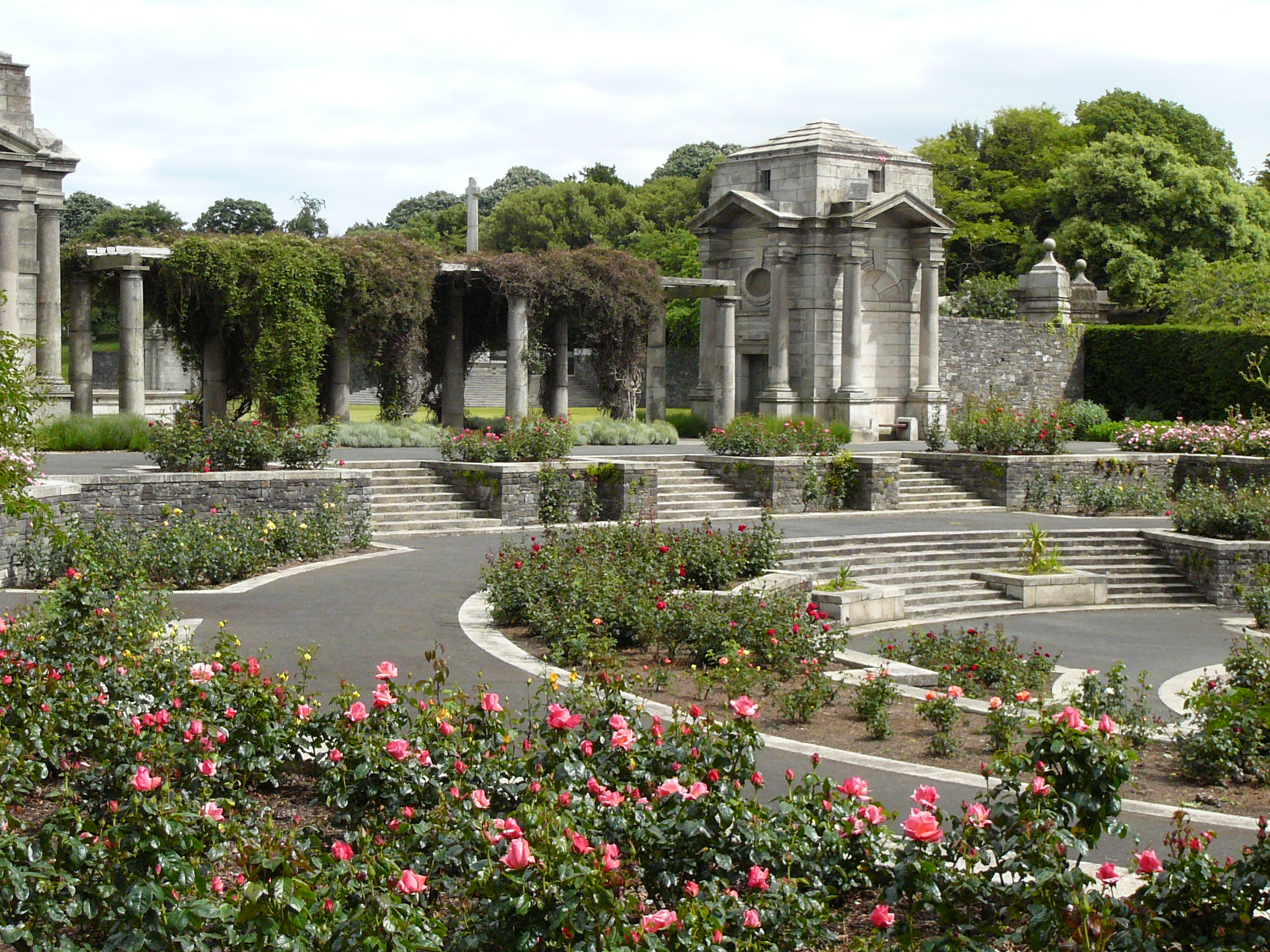
The Irish National War Memorial Gardens, officially opened in 1995

In the 1990s, however, there was a resurgence of interest in World War I memorials. This was driven partially by a sequence of academic works on the social and cultural character of the conflict, aided by a sequence of artistic exhibits of some of more famous designers in the 1980s, and partially by generational change in many countries. As the generation who had lived and fought during the war died off, explaining the context of the memorials became more important. In France, veteran groups had begun to build memorial museums alongside the major monuments and battlefields from the late 1930s onwards.

Similar efforts made at the end of the 20th century to create additional museums to explain the events of the war and the memorials; these initiatives have the support of the Commonwealth War Graves Commission – the successor to the IWGC – but caused concerns amongst British government officials, due to concerns that they might cheapen the symbolism of the memorials. As old imperial links declined, in 1993, Australia decided to repatriate one of its unidentified war dead from the Western front to form its own Tomb of the Unknown Soldier in Canberra.

Meanwhile, some of the political tensions of earlier generations faded, allowing new memorials to be built. In the Republic of Ireland, new war memorials were built, trips organised to war memorials in Europe, and the National War Memorial Gardens were restored and finally officially opened in 1995.

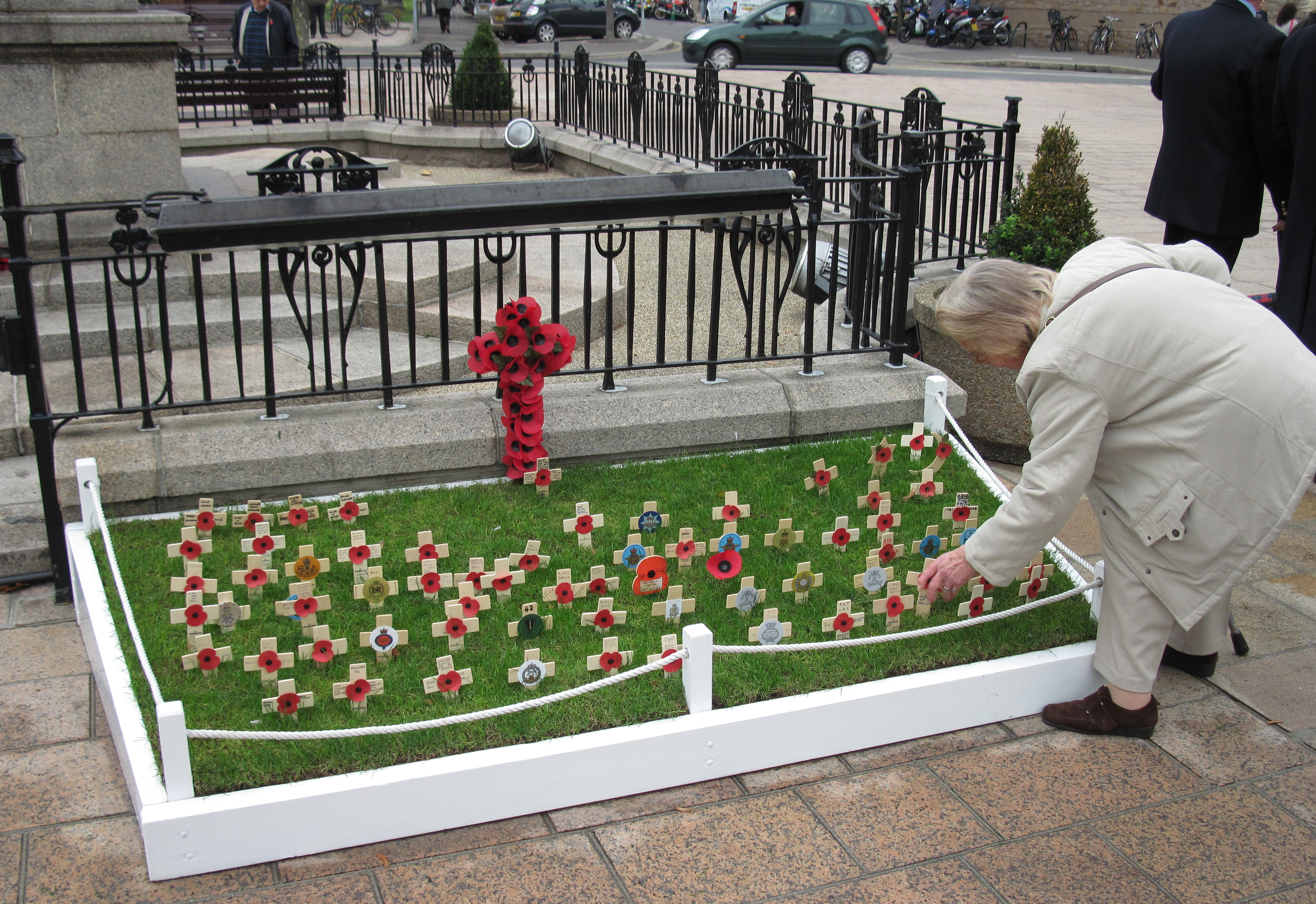
Temporary memorial for Remembrance Day in the Channel Islands, 2011

In Russia, the Memorial park complex of the heroes of the First World War was built on the site of the former Moscow City Fraternity Cemetery after the fall of Communism, opening in 2005 at a cost of 95 million roubles. The park includes 12 monuments, amongst which was the only surviving headstone from the cemetery and a new memorial chapel. In contrast, by the early 21st century, the numbers visiting the IJzertoren tower during the annual pilgrimages declined significantly as memories of the conflict faded.

In the late 1990s and start of the 21st century visitor numbers to the Western Front memorials have risen considerably, and Australian visitors to the memorials at Gallipoli have increased hugely in recent years; the Prime Ministers of Australia and New Zealand opened a new memorial at the site in 2000. World War I memorials remain in ceremonial use on Remembrance Day – the post-World War II successor to Armistice Day – Anzac Day and other national occasions, while many utilitarian memorials are still in use by local communities in the 21st century. Systematic efforts are being made to catalogue and record the memorials, with a number of individual restoration projects undertaken with public and private funding; the Liberty Memorial in the US, for example, was renovated and declared the country's national World War I museum in 2005. During the First World War centenary, the memory of the war became a major theme for scholars and museums. Many museums and historical societies set up special exhibits, websites, and multimedia exhibits. Proposals were put forward to construct a new national US memorial to the conflict in Washington.

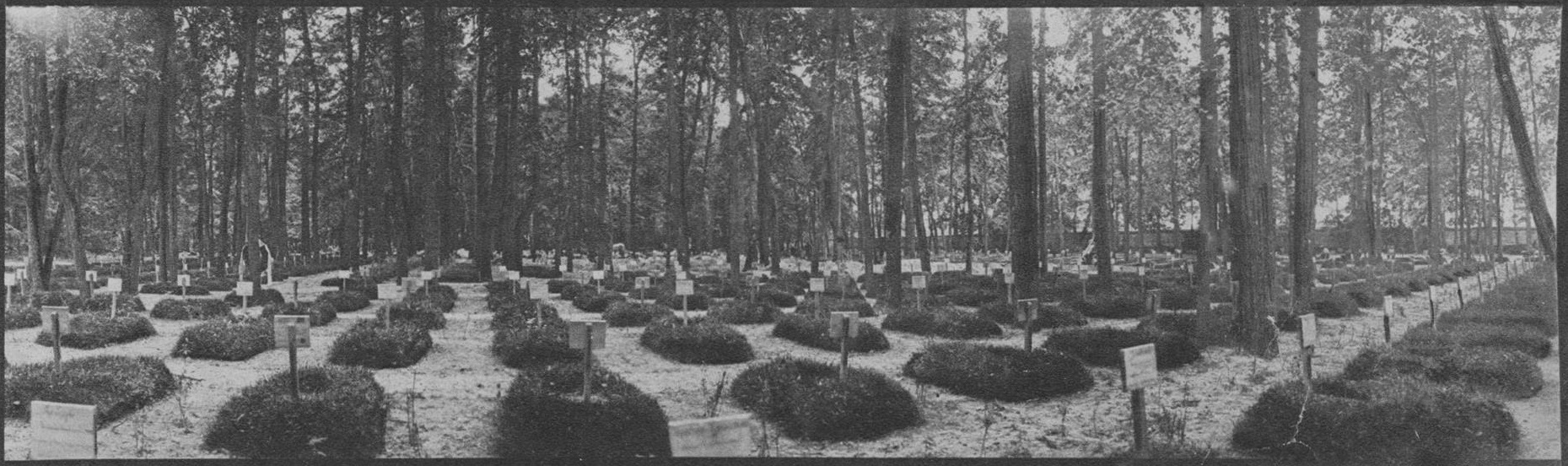
The Moscow City Fraternity Cemetery in Russia, 1915

== See also ==
- List of World War I monuments and memorials
