= Serbian Orthodox Church =

Autocephalous Eastern Orthodox church

Serbian Orthodox Church
- Српска православна црква Srpska pravoslavna crkva
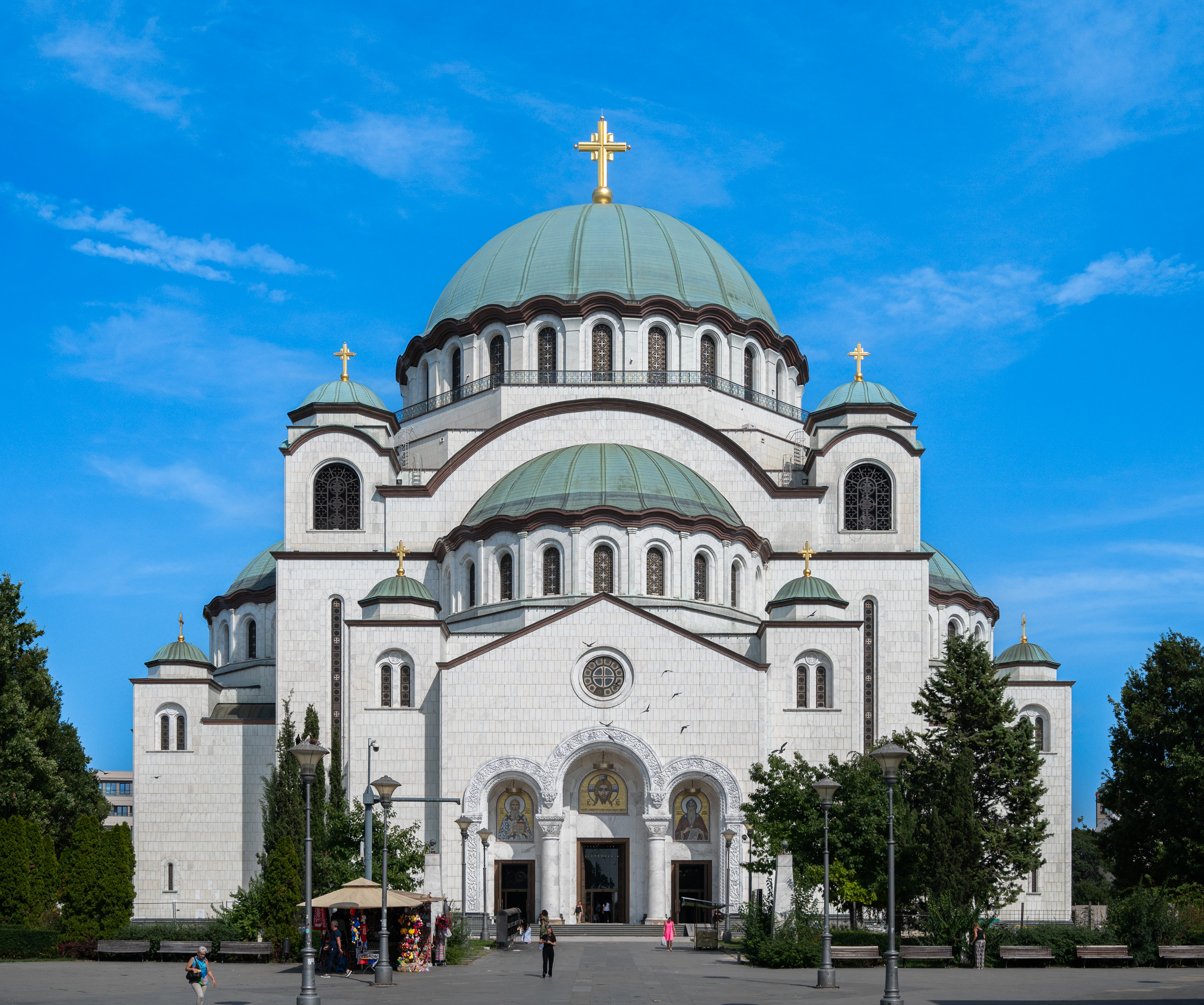
- Church of Saint Sava in Belgrade, Serbia
- Abbreviation: SOC, СПЦ, SPC
- Type: Autocephaly
- Classification: Christian
- Orientation: Eastern Orthodox
- Scripture: Septuagint; New Testament
- Theology: Eastern Orthodox theology
- Polity: Episcopal
- Governance: Holy Synod
- Structure: Communion
- Primate: Patriarch Porfirije
- Bishops: 47
- Priests: 2,863
- Monastics: 1,461
- Parishes: 3,100
- Dioceses: 41
- Monasteries: 204
- Associations: World Council of Churches; Conference of European Churches
- Language: Church Slavonic (worship); Serbian (sermons and paperwork)
- Liturgy: Byzantine Rite
- Headquarters: Palace of the Patriarchate, Belgrade
- Territory: Serbia; Bosnia and Herzegovina; Montenegro; Croatia; Kosovo; Slovenia
- Possessions: Europe, Americas, Australia
- Founder: Saint Sava
- Origin: 1219; 807 years ago Serbian Kingdom
- Independence: 1219–1463; 1557–1766; 1879–present
- Recognition: 1219 (Archbishopric); 1346 (Patriarchate); 1557 (Patriarchate); 1879 (Metropolitanate); 1920 (Patriarchate)
- Separated from: Ecumenical Patriarchate of Constantinople
- Separations: Macedonian Orthodox Church (recognized); Montenegrin Orthodox Church (unrecognized)
- Members: 8 million
- Other names: Serbian Patriarchate; Serbian Church
- Official website: spc.rs

The Serbian Orthodox Church (SOC; Serbian: Српска православна црква, СПЦ, romanized: Srpska pravoslavna crkva, SPC), also known as the Serbian Patriarchate (Serbian: Српска патријаршија, romanized: Srpska patrijaršija), is an autocephalous Eastern Orthodox church in full communion with other Eastern Orthodox churches. It is one of the nine patriarchates and is traditionally ranked sixth in honor and liturgical precedence, following the four ancient patriarchates (Constantinople, Alexandria, Antioch, Jerusalem) and the Moscow Patriarchate. The primate of the church is the Serbian patriarch, currently Porfirije.

The Serbian Orthodox Church exercises exclusive jurisdiction over Orthodox Christians in Serbia, Bosnia and Herzegovina, Montenegro, Croatia, Kosovo, and Slovenia, which together constitute its canonical territory.

The church attained autocephalous status as an archbishopric in 1219 under Saint Sava, its first archbishop. In 1346, it was elevated to the rank of a patriarchate and subsequently became known as the Patriarchate of Peć. Following the Ottoman conquest of Serbia, the patriarchate ceased to function in 1463, but was restored in 1557. It was finally abolished by the Ottoman Empire in 1766, although several regional ecclesiastical jurisdictions continued to exist, most notably the Metropolitanate of Karlovci within the Habsburg monarchy. Following the restoration of Serbian statehood, ecclesiastical autonomy was regained in 1831 through the Metropolitanate of Belgrade, which was granted autocephaly in 1879. The modern Serbian Orthodox Church was established in 1920 through the unification of the Metropolitanate of Belgrade with the Patriarchate of Karlovci and the Metropolitanate of Montenegro. The church itself is the only Serbian institution originating in Serbia which has operated uninterruptedly since the Middle Ages.

== History ==
=== Christianization of Serbs ===
The history of the early medieval Serbian Principality is recorded in the work De Administrando Imperio, compiled by Byzantine emperor Constantine VII (r. 913–959). According to it, the Serbs settled in the Balkans in early 7th century and came under the protection of Emperor Heraclius (r. 610–641) receiving baptism through the Roman Patriarchate. Modern historians, however, regard this account with caution, suggesting that it may reflect only the baptism of a limited group of Serbian ruling class rather than the entire population. From the 7th until the mid-9th century, the Serb lands remained under the influence of the Roman Patriarchate, although their precise diocesan affiliation remains uncertain. The Christianization of the Serbs was a gradual process that was largely completed during the second half of the 9th century. Nevertheless, archaeological evidence suggests that the adoption of Christian practices among the wider population continued well into the Middle Ages. The spread of Christianity is reflected in the appearance of Christian names among members of the Serbian ruling dynasty, including Petar (Peter), Stefan (Stephen), Pavle (Paul), and Zaharija (Zachary). Prince Petar Gojniković (r. 892–917) was evidently a Christian ruler, and Christianity continued to spread during his reign. The Bulgarian annexation of Serbia in 924 further strengthened ecclesiastical and cultural ties with the Slavic Orthodox world. By that time, the Serbs had adopted the Cyrillic script and Old Church Slavonic liturgical texts, already familiar although perhaps not yet preferred to Greek. Among the earliest surviving manuscripts connected with the Serbian recension of Old Church Slavonic is the 10th- or 11th-century Gospel Book Codex Marianus, written in the Glagolitic script. Other early manuscripts include the 12th-century Gršković's fragment of the Acts of the Apostles and Mihanović's fragment of the Acts of the Apostles.

=== Bishopric of Ras ===
The gradual expansion of the Ecumenical Patriarchate of Constantinople into the former Praetorian prefecture of Illyricum began under Emperor Leo III in 731, although whether this jurisdiction immediately extended into the Serb lands remains a matter of scholarly debate.

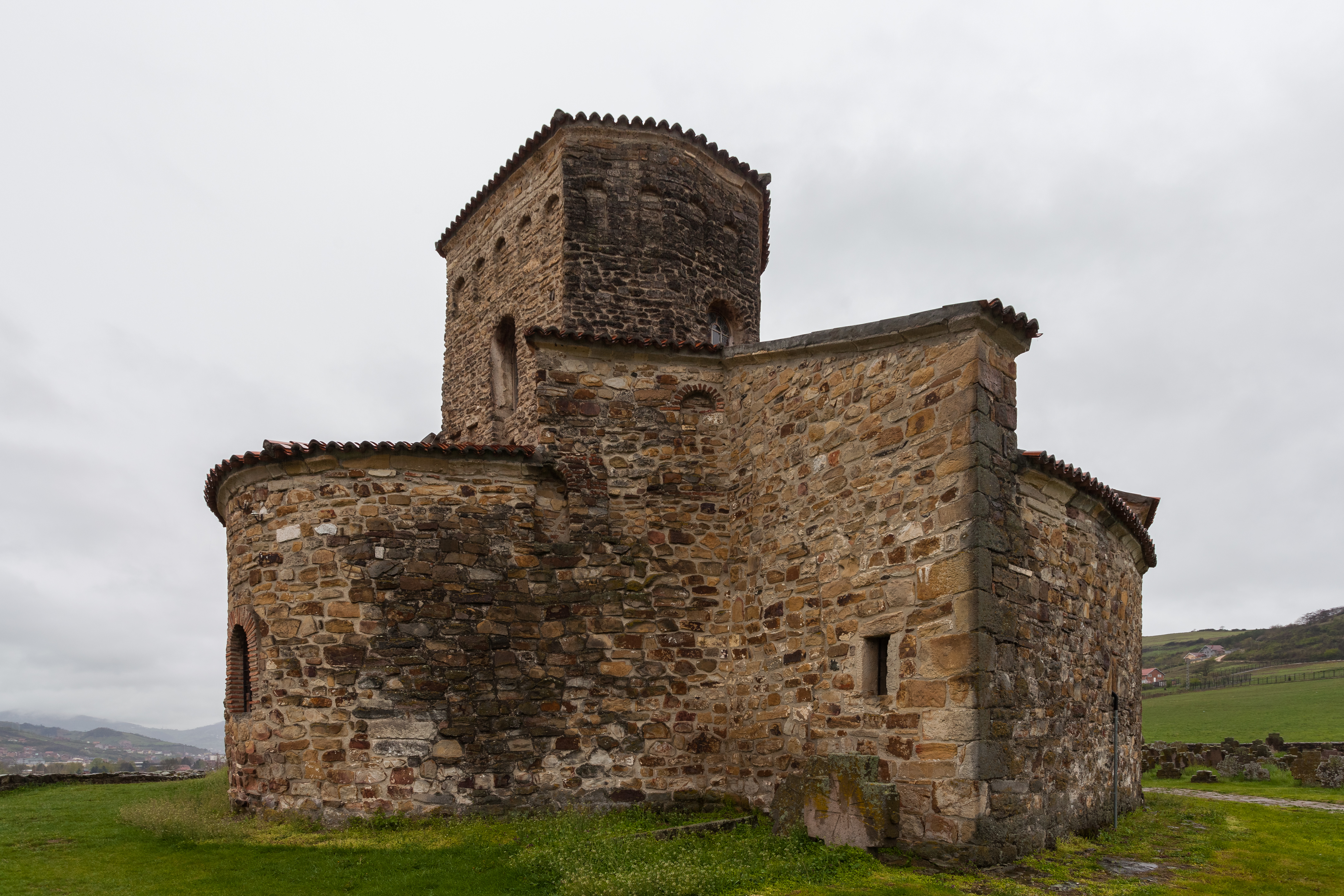
Church of the Holy Apostles Peter and Paul, built around 820, seat of the Bishopric of Ras

The expansion became firmly established during the mid-9th century, when Byzantine emperors and patriarchs increasingly sought to align ecclesiastical organization with imperial political authority. During this period the Western Balkans were also contested between the Byzantine Empire and the Carolingian Empire. Emperor Basil I actively strengthened Byzantine influence in the region, probably dispatching an embassy to Prince Mutimir, while Serb forces participated alongside those of Zachlumia, Travunia, and Konavle in the Byzantine relief of Ragusa during the Arab siege of 869. In 873, Pope John VIII invited Mutimir to recognize the jurisdiction of the restored bishopric of Sirmium, but Mutimir instead maintained communion with Constantinople.

According to one scholarly interpretation, a Serbian bishopric was established at Ras during Mutimir's reign as part of the ecclesiastical reorganization confirmed by the Fourth Council of Constantinople (879–880) and the creation of the autonomous Archbishopric of Bulgaria. More recent scholarship, however, considers this hypothesis unproven since no contemporary source mentions a Serbian bishopric during the 9th century, and the Serbian Church may have remained under neighboring episcopal sees. Likewise, Byzantine primary sources contain no evidence for the establishment of a new ecclesiastical centre in Serbia during this period, suggesting that Ras became the seat of a bishopric only by 1019 or 1020. The earliest reliable reference to the Bishopric of Ras appears in the imperial charters of Emperor Basil II issued in 1020 following the Byzantine conquest of Bulgaria. These charters established the rights of the Archbishopric of Ohrid and state that the Bishopric of Ras belonged to the autocephalous Archbishopric of Bulgaria during the reigns of Peter I and Samuel. The bishopric was relatively small, and although some historians have suggested that it was founded under Bulgarian rule, others argue that the charters merely establish the latest possible date by which it had become part of the Bulgarian ecclesiastical organization.

=== Serbian Archbishopric ===
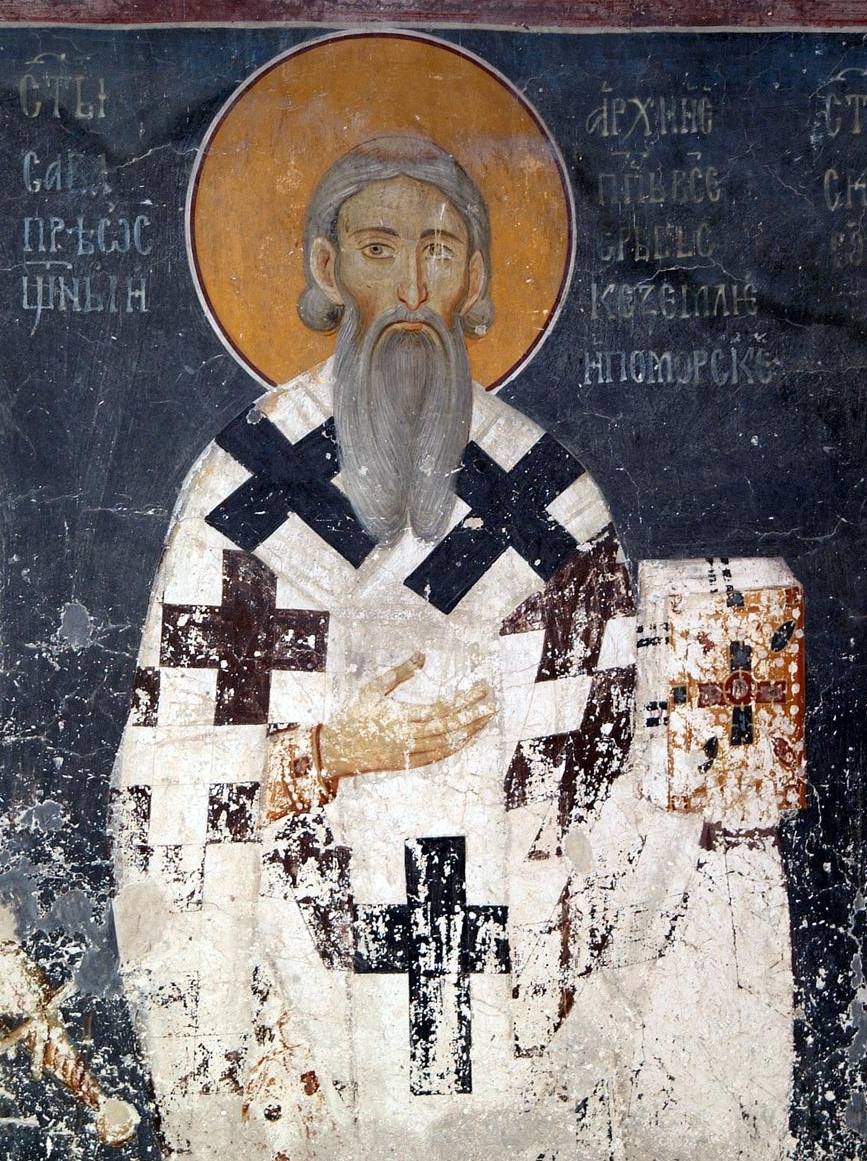
Saint Sava, equal-to-apostles, first Serbian archbishop

Serbian prince Rastko Nemanjić, the youngest son of Grand Prince Stefan Nemanja, took monastic vows at Mount Athos in 1192 under the name Sava (Sabbas). Together with his father, who later joined him as the monk Simeon, they restored the abandoned monastery of Hilandar, which became the principal spiritual and cultural centre of medieval Serbia and played an important role in the development of art, literature, and religious life. Sava's father died at Hilandar in 1199 and was later canonized as Saint Simeon the Myroblyte. Sava returned to Serbia in 1207, bringing with him his father's relics, which were enshrined at Studenica Monastery. At the request of his brother, Stefan the First-Crowned, who became the first king of Serbia in 1217, Sava remained in Serbia, where he devoted himself to pastoral work, ecclesiastical organisation, and religious education. During this period he founded several monasteries, including Žiča which would later become the first seat of the Serbian Archbishopric.

Following Serbia's elevation to a kingdom, the reorganisation of the Serbian Church became a matter of increasing importance. In 1219 Sava was consecrated as the first Archbishop of the Serbian Church and received autocephaly from Ecumenical Patriarch Manuel I. In the same year, Sava compiled and promulgated the Zakonopravilo ("Nomocanon"), which established the legal and canonical foundations of the Serbian Church and state. Sava established several new dioceses, appointed bishops to administer them, and travelled extensively throughout the Serb lands to oversee the implementation of the new ecclesiastical organization. The dioceses established during the tenure of Saint Sava as archbishop were: Eparchy of Žiča (which incorporated old Bishopric of Ras), Eparchy of Zeta, Eparchy of Dabar, Eparchy of Budimlja, Eparchy of Moravica, Eparchy of Toplica, Eparchy of Hvosno (which incorporated old Eparchy of Lipljan).

In 1229 or 1233, Sava undertook a pilgrimage to the Holy Land, where he was received in Jerusalem by Patriarch Athanasius II. During his journey he visited Bethlehem, the Jordan River, and the Mar Saba Monastery, from whom he had taken his monastic name. With the approval of the patriarch and the monastery's brotherhood, Sava acquired the monasteries of Saint John of Patmos on Mount Zion and Saint George at Akona for Serb monks. He also received the icon Trojeručica ("Three-handed Theotokos") from the Mar Saba Monastery, which he later entrusted to Hilandar. On his return journey from the Holy Land, Sava died in Veliko Tarnovo, the capital of the Second Bulgarian Empire, where he was buried in the Church of the Holy Forty Martyrs. In 1237, his relics were transferred to Mileševa Monastery in Serbia.

In 1253, the seat of the Serbian Archbishopric was transferred from Žiča to the Peć Monastery by Archbishop Arsenije I. Thereafter the Serbian primates alternated between the two seats. Sometime between 1276 and 1292, Cuman forces burned Žiča Monastery, prompting King Stefan Milutin (1282–1321) to restore it between 1292 and 1309, during the patriarchate of Jevstatije II. Between 1289 and 1290 the monastery's principal treasures, including the relics of Jevstatije I, were transferred to Peć Monastery. During Milutin's reign the Gračanica Monastery was built, while under his successor, King Stefan Uroš III, the Visoki Dečani Monastery was constructed under the supervision of Archbishop Danilo II.

=== First Patriarchate of Peć ===
The status of the Serbian Archbishopric developed in parallel with the territorial expansion and increasing prestige of the Serbian Kingdom. Over the following century, the Serbian Church reached the height of its power and influence within the medieval Serbian state and the broader Eastern Orthodox world. By the 14th century, Serbian Orthodox clergy had the title of protos at Mount Athos.

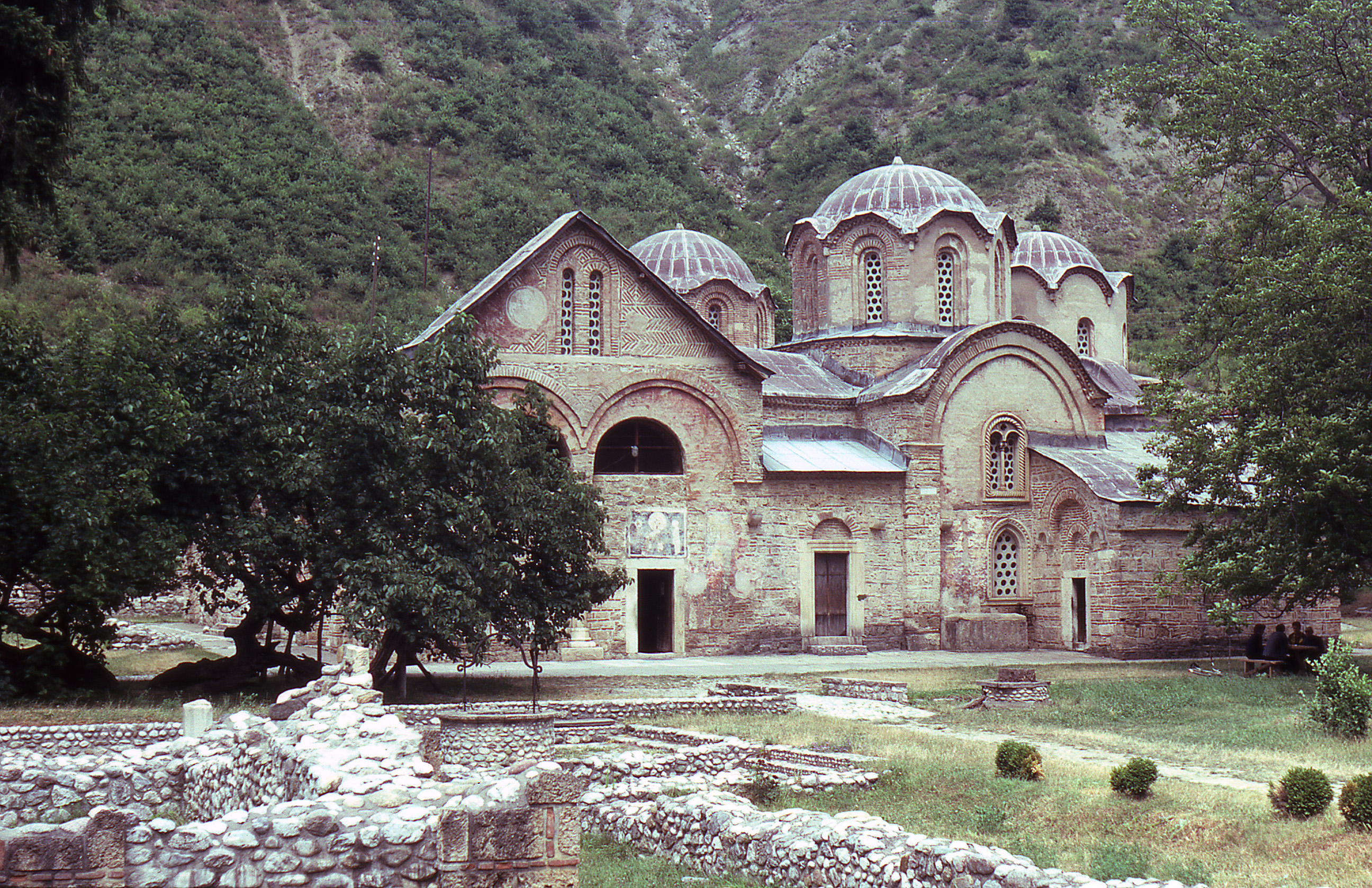
Peć Monastery, seat of the Patriarchate of Peć

On 16 April 1346, King Stefan Dušan convened a Grand Assembly in Skopje, attended by the Serbian Archbishop Joanikije II, Archbishop of Ohrid Nicholas I, Patriarch of Bulgaria Simeon, and various ecclesiastical representatives from Mount Athos. The Assembly formally agreed to and ceremonially enacted the elevation of the Serbian Archbishopric to the status of a patriarchate. The newly elevated Patriarch Joanikije II subsequently crowned Stefan Dušan as the Emperor of the Serbs. The elevation to patriarchal status also led to the reorganization of the ecclesiastical hierarchy, including establishing the patriarchal seat at the Peć Monastery and the promotion of several bishoprics to metropolitanates. At its height, the patriarchate asserted jurisdiction over Mount Athos and a number of ecclesiastical territories previously under the authority of the Ecumenical Patriarchate of Constantinople. These developments contributed to the excommunication of Stefan Dušan by Ecumenical Patriarch Callistus I in 1350. In 1375, a reconciliation agreement was reached between the Serbina Patriarchate of Peć and the Ecumenical Patriarchate of Constantinople.

Among the most significant cultural, artistic, and literary legacies produced under the auspices of the Serbian Church in the medieval period were hagiographies, known in Serbian as žitije, which were composed as biographies of rulers, archbishops, and saints from the 12th through the 15th centuries. These works played an important role not only in shaping the spiritual life of medieval Serbia but also in preserving historical memory and reinforcing dynastic and ecclesiastical legitimacy.

The Ottoman Empire conquered the Serbian Despotate in 1459, the Bosnian Kingdom in 1463, Herzegovina in 1482, and Zeta in 1496. After the death of Patriarch Arsenije II in 1463, no successor was elected, and the Serbian Patriarchate effectively ceased to function. As a result, the Serbian Church passed under the jurisdiction of the Archbishopric of Ohrid. The incorporation of Serbian ecclesiastical structures into the jurisdiction of Ohrid proceeded in parallel with the consolidation of Ottoman political authority in the region. In areas where Ottoman control was not yet fully established, the Archbishopric of Ohrid was often unable to assert effective jurisdiction. During this transitional period, several instances point to a degree of continued autonomy among certain Serbian ecclesiastical leaders, who are mentioned in sources without clear subordination to the Archbishop of Ohrid. This was particularly evident in the case of the Metropolitan of Zeta (until 1496), the Metropolitan of Herzegovina (until 1482), and the Metropolitan of Belgrade, who operated under Hungarian rule until 1526.

=== Second Patriarchate of Peć ===
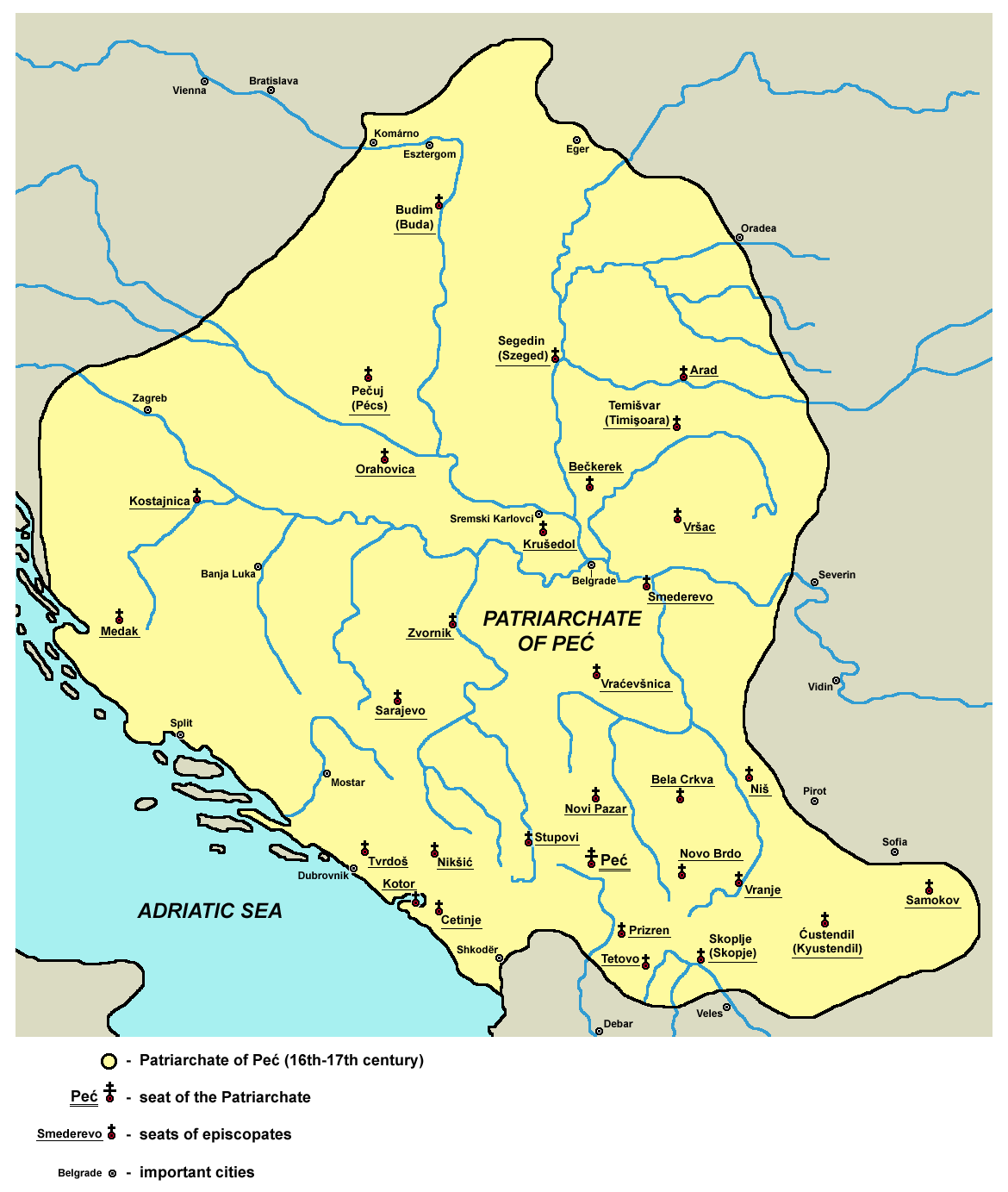
Jurisdiction of the Patriarchate od Peć in the 16th and 17th centuries

After several unsuccessful attempts between 1530 and 1541 by Metropolitan Pavle of Smederevo to restore autocephaly by seizing the throne of Peć Monastery and proclaiming himself "Archbishop of Peć and Serbian Patriarch", the Serbian Patriarchate was ultimately restored in 1557 under Sultan Suleiman the Magnificent. This restoration was made possible through the influence of the powerful Ottoman statesman Sokollu Mehmed Pasha, who was of Serbian origin. His relative, the bishop Makarije Sokolović, was elected Patriarch of Peć.

The re-establishment of the patriarchate represented a major development for the Serbian Orthodox population, as it contributed to the spiritual consolidation and ecclesiastical unity of Serbs within the Ottoman Empire. While a degree of Islamisation occurred over time, a large majority of Serbs remained within the confessional framework of the Serbian Church.

In 1594, Serbs rose up against Ottoman rule in Banat, during the Long Turkish War which was fought at the Austrian-Ottoman border in the Balkans. The Serbian Patriarchate and rebels had established relations with foreign states, and had captured several towns, although the uprising was quickly suppressed. The rebels had, in the character of a religious war, carried war flags with the icon of Saint Sava. Ottoman Grand vizier Sinan Pasha ordered that the sarcophagus and relics of Saint Sava at the Mileševa Monastery be brought by military convoy to Belgrade. As a form of retaliation against the rebels, the Ottomans publicly burned the relics on a pyre on 27 April 1595. The modern day Church of Saint Sava now stands on the Vračar plateau, the presumed site of this event.

In the intervening period, the Patriarchate of Peć functioned within the framework of the millet system, maintaining jurisdiction over most Serbian ecclesiastical structures despite intermittent internal instability and financial burdens imposed by the Ottoman administration. The 17th century was marked by fluctuating conditions, including periods of relative consolidation under certain patriarchs but also increasing fiscal pressure and political vulnerability tied to broader Habsburg–Ottoman conflicts. By the early 18th century, the weakening of the patriarchal administration and its accumulated debts contributed to the gradual reduction of its autonomy, culminating in its final abolition by Ottoman decree in 1766. Thereafter, the Serb-inhabited territories were placed under the jurisdiction of the Ecumenical Patriarchate of Constantinople.

=== Period of separate jurisdictions ===
Following the Great Migration of the Serbs and the establishment of the Metropolitanate of Karlovci in the Habsburg monarchy in the early 18th century, Serbian Orthodox ecclesiastical life developed under different political jurisdictions. In the Ottoman Empire, following the abolition of the Serbian Patriarchate of Peć in 1766, ecclesiastical authority over the Serbian Orthodox population passed to the Ecumenical Patriarchate, while the autonomous Metropolitanate of Belgrade was established in 1831. In the Prince-Bishopric of Montenegro, the Metropolitanate of Montenegro continued as a distinct ecclesiastical structure, resulting in the existence of three separate Serbian Orthodox jurisdictions across Serb-inhabited lands in the 18th and 19th centuries. In addition, Orthodox Serbs in Bosnia-Herzegovina and Kosovo remained under the jurisdiction of the Ecumenical Patriarchate of Constantinople, although after the Austro-Hungarian occupation (1878) of Bosnia and Herzegovina, local eparchies gained internal autonomy.

==== Metropolitanate/Patriarchate of Karlovci ====
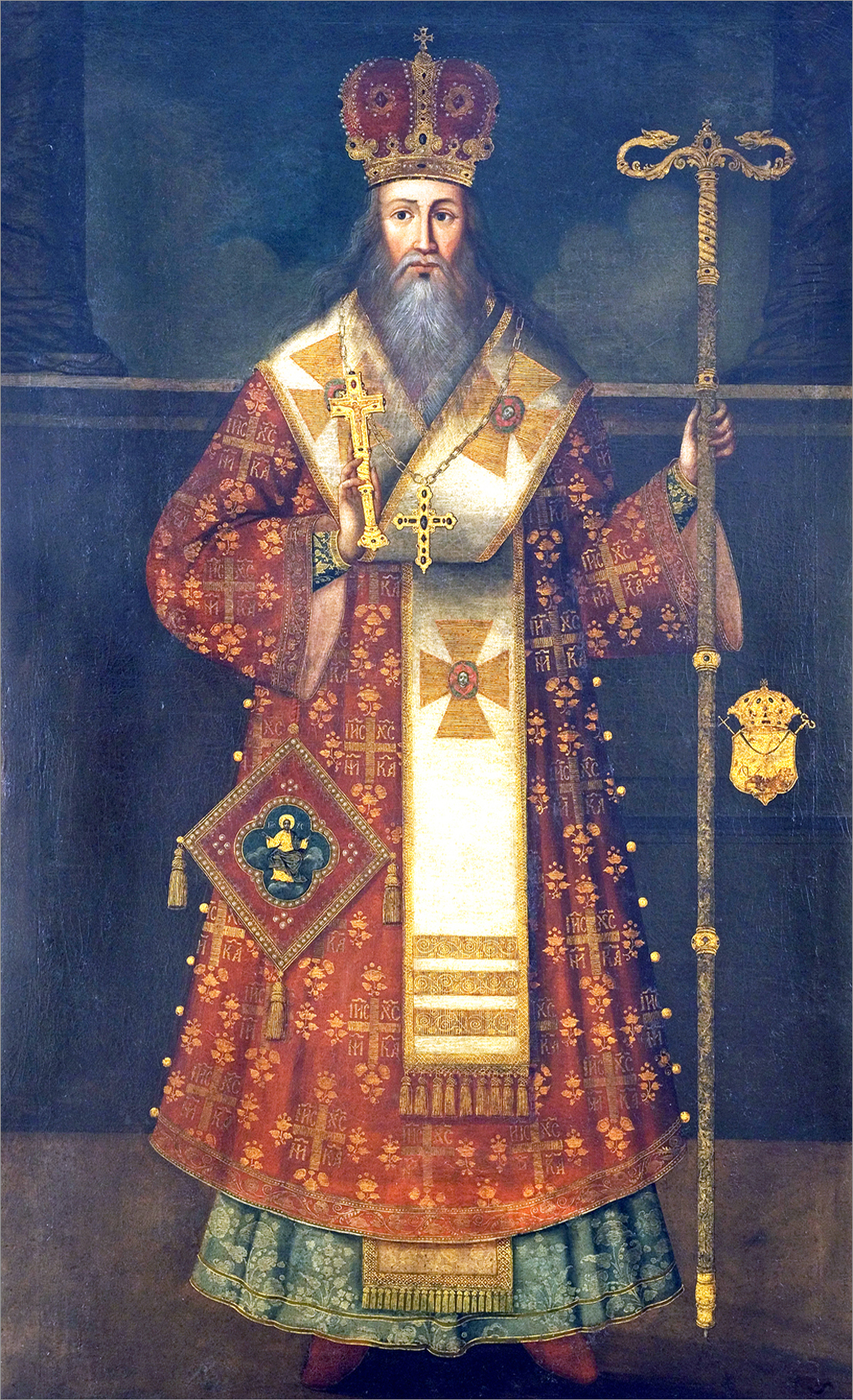
Patriarch Arsenije III, leader of the Great Migration of the Serbs

The Metropolitanate of Karlovci emerged in the Habsburg monarchy following the Great Migration of the Serbs in 1690, when Patriarch Arsenije III led a large part of the Serbian population north of the Sava and Danube. In 1708, the ecclesiastical organization of Serbs in the Habsburg monarchy was consolidated with the recognition of the Metropolitanate of Karlovci as their autonomous church jurisdiction. It functioned as the ecclesiastical authority for Orthodox Serbs within the monarchy, with its seat in Sremski Karlovci. Throughout the 18th century, the metropolitanate developed a stable institutional structure, including dioceses and seminaries. By the end of the 18th century, the Metropolitanate of Karlovci included a large territory that stretched from the Adriatic Sea to Bukovina and from Danube and Sava to Upper Hungary.

At the May Assembly in Sremski Karlovci in 1848, prior to the Serb uprising of 1848–49, the Serbs proclaimed the creation of the Serbian Vojvodina, a Serb autonomous region within the Monarchy. The metropolitan of Karlovci, Josif Rajačić, was also proclaimed "Serbian Patriarch", thus the Metropolitanate of Karlovci became a patriarchate. The title of "Serbian Patriarch" given to Rajačić was confirmed by the Emperor Franz Joseph I the same year. The newly proclaimed Patriarchate of Karlovci continued to serve as the principal church authority for Serbs in the monarchy.

==== Metropolitanate of Montenegro ====
The Metropolitanate of Montenegro developed as the ecclesiastical jurisdiction of the Orthodox population of Old Montenegro under Ottoman pressure and strong regional fragmentation, with its seat at the Cetinje Monastery. Its consolidation began when in 1697 Danilo Petrović-Njegoš was elected metropolitan, initiating the long-lasting rule of the Petrović-Njegoš dynasty. From the early 18th century, the metropolitans of Montenegro combined ecclesiastical and secular authority in a system of theocracy, maintaining diplomatic and financial ties with Republic of Venice and especially the Russian Empire. Throughout the 18th century, metropolitans of Montenegro continued to be ordained by the Patriarchs of Peć (until 1766), and later by the Metropolitans of Karlovci (until 1830). In the early 19th century, Petar I Petrović-Njegoš and Petar II Petrović-Njegoš expanded the political and territorial role of through the unification of Old Montenegro and Brda and the centralization of governance. In 1852, following the separation of secular and spiritual power, the metropolitanate continued as a distinct ecclesiastical institution.

==== Metropolitanate of Belgrade ====
The emergence of the Metropolitanate of Belgrade was closely linked to the development of the autonomous Principality of Serbia after 1815, when the Eastern Orthodoxy became increasingly associated with the political consolidation of the new state and Serbian national identity. In 1831, the Ecumenical Patriarchate of Constantinople granted ecclesiastical autonomy to the Church in Serbia, which was reorganized as the Metropolitanate of Belgrade. Although autonomous, it remained under the canonical jurisdiction of the Ecumenical Patriarchate. During the following decades, the Metropolitanate developed in parallel with the expanding autonomy of the Principality of Serbia. After Serbia achieved internationally recognized independence in 1878, negotiations were initiated with the Ecumenical Patriarchate regarding full ecclesiastical independence. These culminated in 1879 with the recognition of autocephaly for the Metropolitanate of Belgrade. The autocephalous status confirmed the church's full independence in ecclesiastical governance, aligning it with the sovereign status of the Principality of Serbia, later elevated to the Kingdom of Serbia in 1882.

=== Serbian Orthodox Church ===
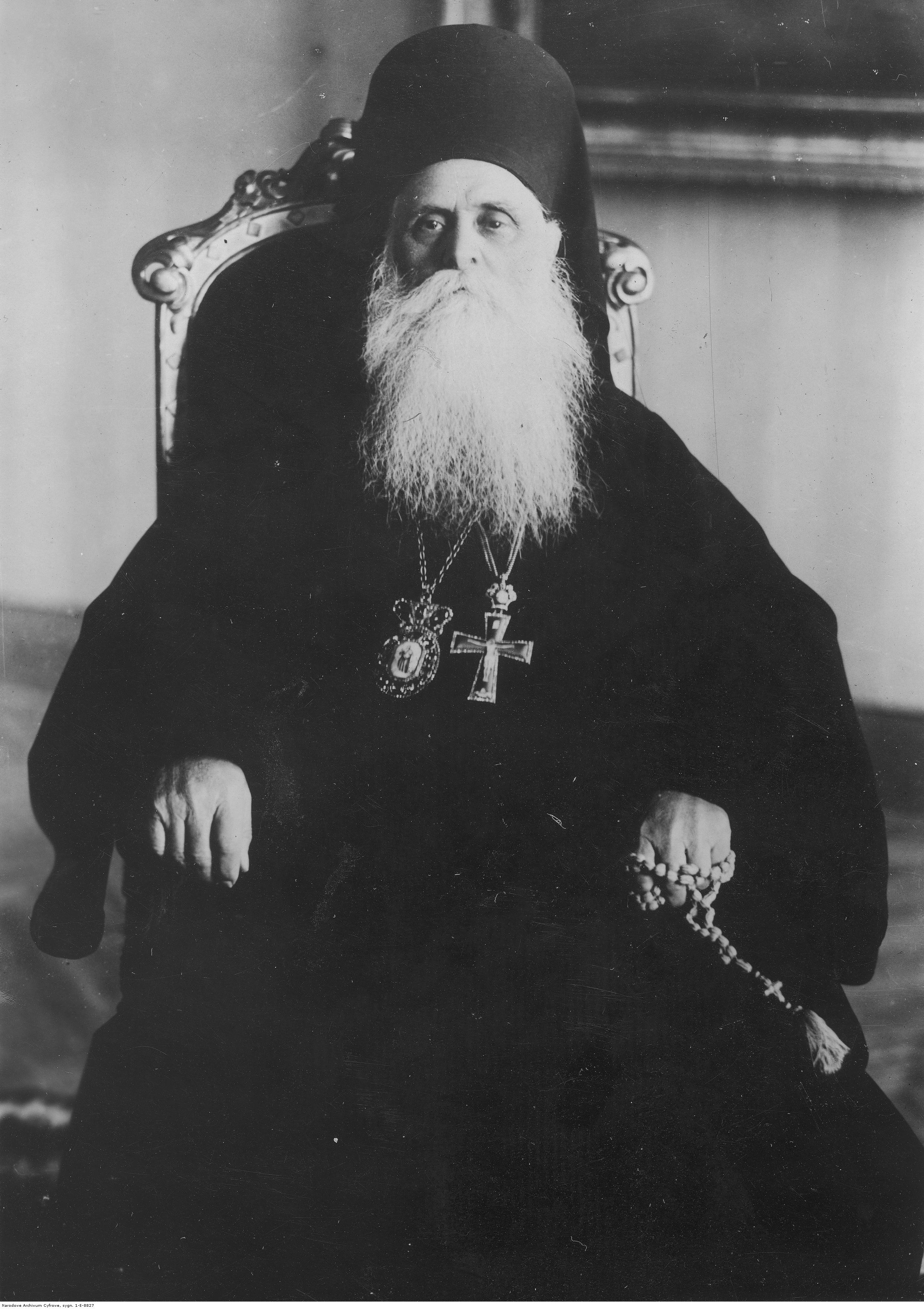
Patriarch Dimitrije, first primate of the reunited Serbian Orthodox Church

In 1918, following the end of World War I, the Kingdom of Montenegro was united with the Kingdom of Serbia, and only days later the Kingdom of Serbs, Croats, and Slovenes was established (renamed the Kingdom of Yugoslavia in 1929). Political unification was followed by the unification of all Eastern Orthodox jurisdictions within the borders of the new state. The Metropolitanate of Montenegro and Patriarchate of Karlovci was merged with the Metropolitanate of Belgrade to form the unified Serbian Orthodox Church in 1920. The first primate of the united Serbian Orthodox Church was Patriarch Dimitrije.

==== Kingdom of Yugoslavia ====
During the interwar period, the Serbian Orthodox Church underwent a significant revival, including the expansion of its ecclesiastical infrastructure. The Church retained jurisdiction over the Eparchy of Buda in Hungary and established a new diocese for the Czech lands in 1921, while in 1931 another diocese, the Eparchy of Mukachevo and Prešov, was created for Eastern Orthodox Christians in Slovakia and Transcarpathia. At the same time, the first diocese among the diaspora was established, namely the Eparchy of America and Canada.

As one of the most influential institutions in the state, the church maintained a close relationship with the political establishment of the Yugoslav monarchy. This alignment with the state was strained during the Concordat Crisis of 1937-1938, when the church and its leadership supported widespread public opposition to the proposed concordat between the Kingdom of Yugoslavia and the Holy See, ultimately contributing to its suspension.

==== World War II ====
In World War II the church suffered disruption and persecution following the Axis invasion and occupation of Yugoslavia in 1941. Large parts of its clergy and faithful found themselves under the Ustaše regime of the Independent State of Croatia, which sought to establish a Croatian Orthodox Church, to which some Orthodox Serbs were forcibly affiliated, while many others were killed, expelled, or forced to convert to Catholicism during the Serbian Genocide. Bishops and priests were singled out for persecution, with between 214 and 217 clergy killed and 334 exiled to German-occupied Serbia. Also, the authorities of the Independent State of Croatia systematically looted the monasteries of Fruška Gora (such as Krušedol, Grgeteg, and Hopovo) removing liturgical objects, icons, manuscripts, and revered relics, many of which were transferred to Zagreb or confiscated for private and state use, while a significant number were lost or destroyed. The church's leadership was also directly affected, as Patriarch Gavrilo V was arrested and interned in Dachau concentration camp.

==== Socialist Yugoslavia ====
During the period of socialist Yugoslavia, the Serbian Orthodox Church operated under a secular communist regime that imposed restrictions on religious life, confiscated much of the church's property, and limited its public activities. Despite the gradual relaxation of state policy after the 1950s, the church remained under government surveillance and was largely excluded from public education and political life. It nevertheless preserved its ecclesiastical organization, monastic tradition, and religious life, while continuing to administer its dioceses in Yugoslavia and abroad.

Communist authorities restricted the activities of the Serbian Orthodox Church in Macedonia as part of the drive to build a Macedonian national identity. During this period, they supported the establishment of a separate church jurisdiction, which was proclaimed in 1967 as the Macedonian Orthodox Church. This was strongly resisted by the Serbian Orthodox Church, which it regarded as uncanonical and did not recognize it.

During the 1960s, a schism developed within the Serbian Orthodox Church in North America after a dispute between the church's leadership and Bishop Dionisije Milivojević, who rejected decisions of the Council of Bishops and was deposed in 1964. The resulting division led to the establishment of the self-proclaimed "Free Serbian Orthodox Church," which remained separate from the Serbian Orthodox Church until the schism was healed in 1992 through the reconciliation of the two ecclesiastical structures and the establishment of the Eparchy of New Gračanica.

By the late 1980s, as communist rule weakened, the church had re-emerged as an influential religious and cultural institution in Serbian public life. the rise of rival nationalist movements during the 1980s also led to a marked religious revival throughout Yugoslavia, not least in Serbia.

==== Yugoslav Wars ====
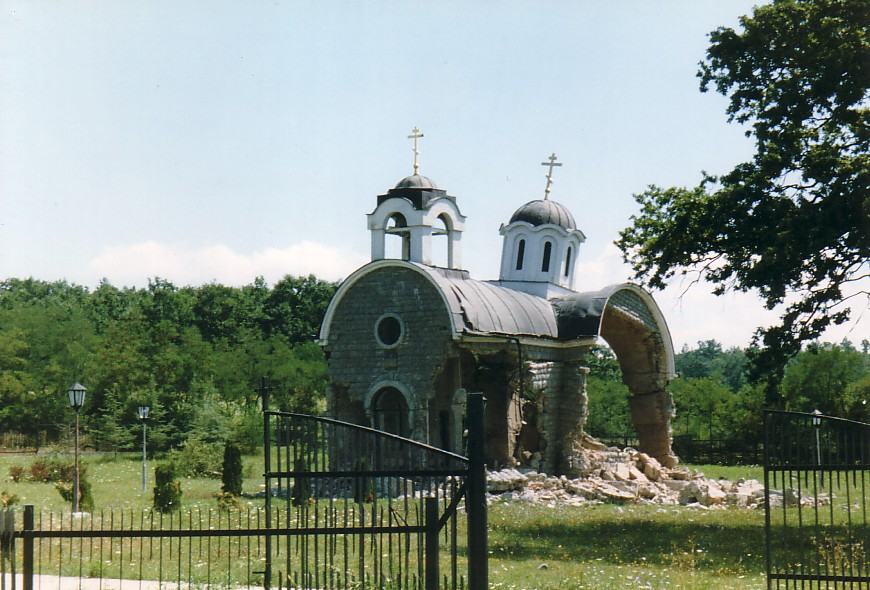
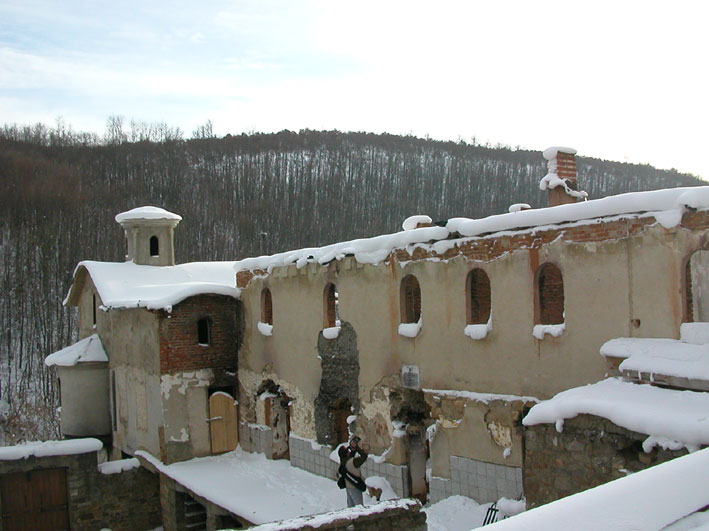
Destroyed Serbian Orthodox churches and monasteries in Kosovo, Holy Trinity Church in Petrič (left) and Devič Monastery (right).

During the breakup of Yugoslavia and ensuing Yugoslav wars in the 1990s, the Serbian Orthodox Church advocated for the protection of Serb populations with many bishops and priests publicly supported Serbian political and military leaders, leading to criticism that parts of the church had contributed to the rise of Serbian nationalism, although the extent and nature of its involvement remain subjects of scholarly debate.

Many Serbian Orthodox churches in Croatia were damaged or destroyed during the war in Croatia. The eparchies of Dalmatia, Gornji Karlovac, and Slavonia were completely abandoned after the exodus of the Serbs in 1995 due to Operation Storm. Serbian Orthodox churches and monasteries suffered damage and destruction during the Bosnian War as well, particularly affected were eparchies Zachlumia-Herzegovina and Bihać-Petrovac. By the end of the decade, the situation had stabilized in both countries and the damaged and destroyed properties were restored, although the process is still underway, notably in the Holy Trinity Cathedral in Mostar, destroyed by Croatian forces in 1992.

Following the end of the Kosovo War and partial exodus of Kosovo Serbs, 156 Serbian Orthodox churches and monasteries have been damaged or destroyed. In the aftermath of the 2004 unrest, additional 35 Serbian Orthodox churches and monasteries were burned or destroyed by Albanian mobs.

==== Recent period ====
Religious education was reintroduced into public schools in Serbia in 2001, while the social status of the clergy was improved through legislation providing pension and social insurance benefits. Numerous churches were restored or newly constructed. A major achievement was the completion of the Church of Saint Sava, making it one of the largest Orthodox churches in the world.

In 2020, the Serbian Orthodox Church organized a wave of protests and religious processions in Montenegro against the "Law on Freedom of Religion or Belief and the Legal Status of Religious Communities" which effectively transferred ownership of church buildings built before 1918 from the Serbian Orthodox Church to the Montenegrin state. Law was eventually repealed after the parliamentary elections later that year.

In 2022, a longstanding schism was resolved when the Serbian Orthodox Church restored communion with the Macedonian Orthodox Church and recognized its autocephaly.

== Demographics ==
It is estimated that approximately 8 million people worldwide belong to the Serbian Orthodox Church.

Based on official census data from countries within the church's jurisdiction, the number of adherents is estimated at more than 7 million in its canonical territory. Since the Serbian Orthodox Church is the sole canonical Eastern Orthodox jurisdiction in Serbia, Montenegro, Bosnia and Herzegovina, Croatia, Slovenia, and Kosovo, the entire Eastern Orthodox population in these countries (of which approximately 95% are ethnic Serbs) is regarded as being at least nominally affiliated with the church. Eastern Orthodoxy is by far the largest religious denomination in Serbia (5,387,426 adherents or 81% of the population) and in Montenegro (443,394 or 71%). It is the second-largest religious denomination in Bosnia and Herzegovina (1,089,658 or 31.2%), Croatia (128,395 or 3.3%), and Kosovo (about 95,000 or 5%). In Slovenia, the number of Orthodox Christians stood at 45,908 or 2.4% of the population.

Figures for number of people affiliated with the church outside its canonical territory (dioceses in Europe, Americas, and Australia) are not known, though estimates may be derived from the size of the Serb diaspora, which is estimated to number about 1.6 million people.

== Organization ==
The organization of the Church is defined by the Constitution of the Serbian Orthodox Church, adopted in 1931 and amended several times since.

=== Hierarchy ===
Ecclesiastical authority canonically belongs only to the hierarchy.

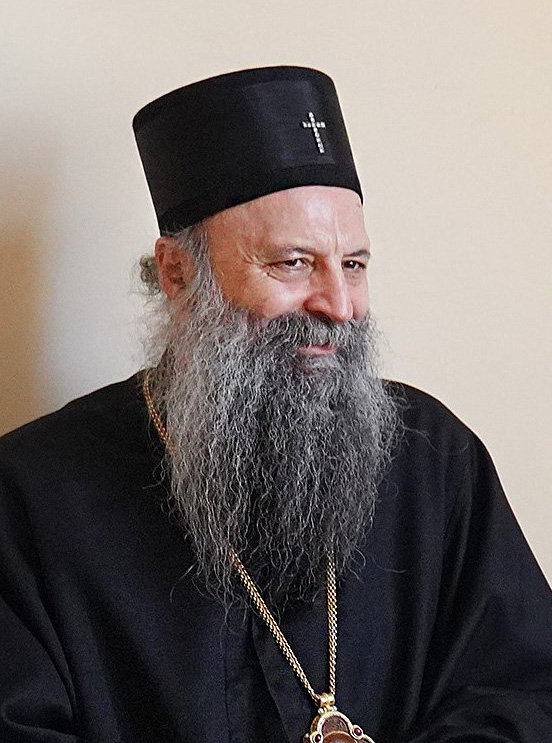
Patriarch Porfirije, the 46th and current head of the Serbian Orthodox Church

The head of the church is the Serbian patriarch. Elected from among active bishops, he acts as first among equals, represents the church before the state and other autocephalous churches, preserves the unity of the hierarchy, consecrates bishops, and chairs the Serbian Holy Synod, or Holy Synod of the Serbian Orthodox Church.

The Council of Bishops is the supreme body of the church, consisted of the patriarch, metropolitan bishops, bishops, and vicars. It is convened annually in May, though extraordinary sessions may also be called when necessary. The Council of Bishops interprets Orthodox doctrine in accordance with Holy Scripture and Sacred tradition as well as canonical rules and regulations, regulates the internal and external mission of the church for the preservation and promotion of the Eastern Orthodox faith and Christian morality, canonizes saints, elects Patriarch and bishops, decides on the territorial organization (including the establishment and division of dioceses and vicariates), determines disciplinary regulations for the clergy, including ecclesiastical judicial matters, acts as the supreme ecclesiastical judicial body (adjudicating major disputes and appeals, including cases involving bishops and the patriarch).

The governing body of the church is its holy synod. It is composed of five members, patriarch and four bishops. The holy synod takes care of the everyday operation of the church, holding meetings on a regular basis. It maintains the dogmatic and canonical unity of the church, oversees liturgical life (including the uniform performance of worship, publication of service books, and administration of the Holy Sacraments), manages administrative and financial affairs, supervises the work of bishops, prepares the agenda for the Council of Bishops and implements its decisions, supervises theological schools and seminaries as well as church art, iconography, relics, and other ecclesiastical heritage.

=== Territorial organisation ===
Canonical territories of Eastern Orthodox jurisdictions; the canonical territory of the Serbian Orthodox Church shown in turquoise.

The Serbian Orthodox Church has an episcopal polity, with the diocese serving as its primary administrative unit in both hierarchical and self-governing organization. The canonical territory of the church (encompassing Serbia, Montenegro, Bosnia and Herzegovina, Croatia, Kosovo, and Slovenia) is divided into one archdiocese (headed by the Patriarch), 3 metropolitanates (headed by metropolitan bishops), and 25 eparchies (headed by bishops). Outside its canonical territory, the church maintains one metropolitanate and 11 eparchies serving the Serb diaspora.

Dioceses are divided into deaneries, each consisting of parishes, which are the smallest units of church organization and are led by a parish priest.

=== Clergy and monasticism ===
As in other Orthodox Christian churches, male graduates of seminaries may be ordained as deacons and eventually as priests. The vast majority of parish clergy in the Serbian Orthodox Church are married.

Alternatively, they may enter monasteries and/or take monastic vows. Monastics who are ordained as priests and possess a university degree in theology are eligible as candidates for the episcopate (archimandrites). Women may also take monastic vows and become nuns. The church has 204 active monastic communities, including dozens affiliated with dioceses abroad, primarily in the United States, Canada, and Australia. Some of the monasteries are major pilgrimage sites such as Ostrog in Montenegro and Tuman in Serbia, both receiving over 1 million people annually.

== Doctrine and practice ==
=== Theology ===
The Serbian Orthodox Church upholds the Eastern Orthodox theology, shared by all Eastern Orthodox churches and based on doctrinal accomplishments of the First seven ecumenical councils. It is characterised by monotheistic trinitarianism, a belief in the incarnation of the Logos (Son of God), a balancing of cataphatic theology with apophatic theology, a hermeneutic defined by Sacred Tradition, and a therapeutic soteriology. In the fields of ecclesial organisation and administration, it upholds traditions and principles of Eastern Orthodox ecclesiology.

=== Liturgy and worship ===
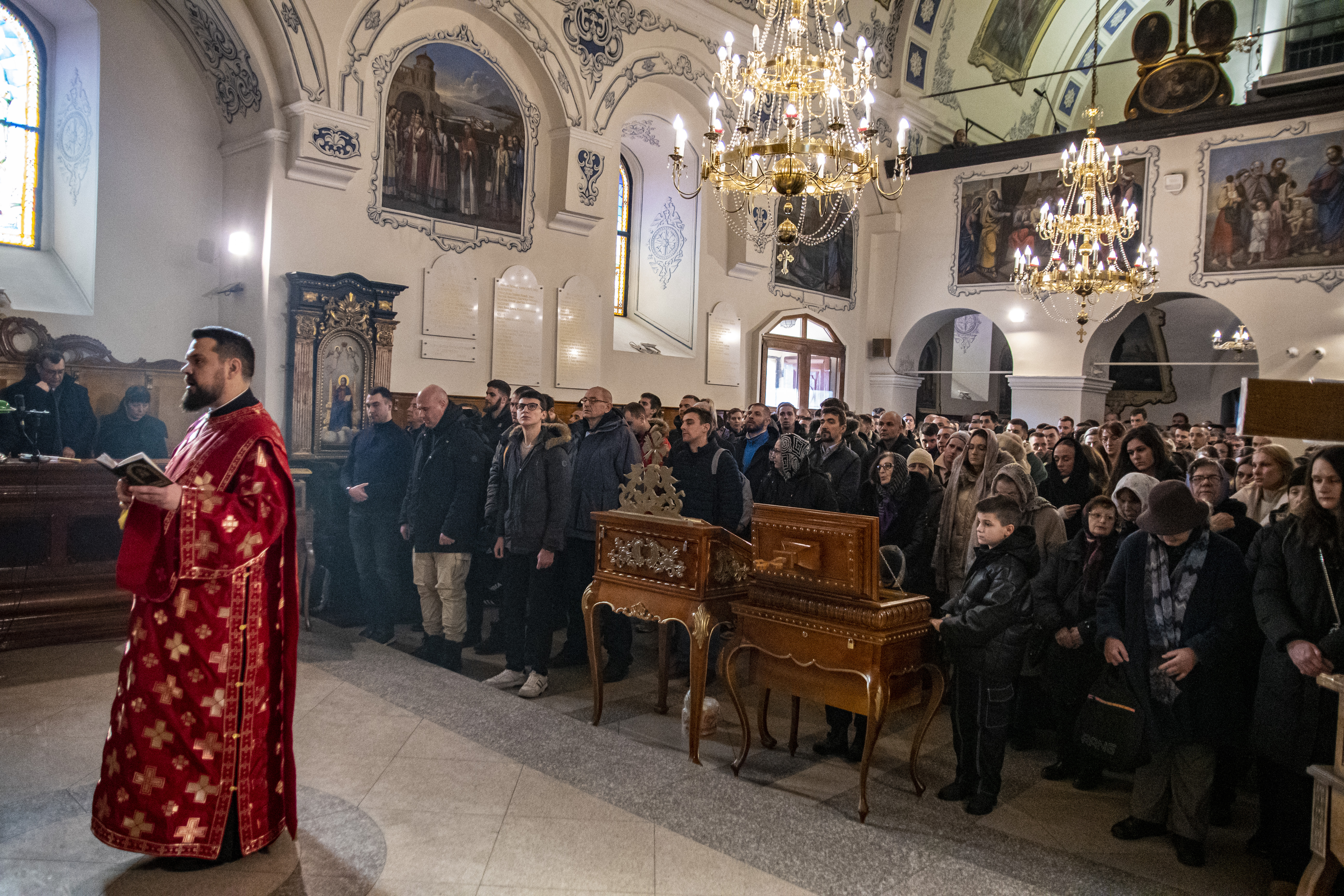
Divine Liturgy at the Church of the Nativity of the Theotokos in Zemun

Liturgical traditions and practices of the Serbian Orthodox Church are based on Eastern Orthodox worship. Services cannot properly be conducted by a single person but require the presence of at least one other participant. While the full cycle of services is usually celebrated daily only in larger churches and cathedrals as well as in monasteries, smaller parish churches often hold services only on weekends and major feast days. The Divine Liturgy is the celebration of the Eucharist. It is not celebrated on weekdays during the preparatory season of Great Lent. Communion is consecrated on Sundays and distributed during the week at the Liturgy of the Presanctified Gifts. Services, especially the Divine Liturgy, can only be performed once a day on any particular altar.

=== Social and moral issues ===
The Serbian Orthodox Church generally maintains conservative positions on sexual ethics, family life, and bioethical issues.

The church teaches that sexual relations are allowed only within heterosexual marriage, which is regarded as a sacramental union oriented toward mutual love and procreation. Chastity is considered a universal Christian virtue expressed differently in marriage and monastic life. Premarital and extramarital sexual relations are regarded as incompatible with Orthodox moral teaching. Marriage is understood as a lifelong union between one man and one woman, while divorce is generally viewed as a pastoral concession rather than an ideal form.

The Serbian Orthodox Church does not recognize same-sex unions as marriage and considers homosexual sexual activity incompatible with Orthodox moral teaching. It has repeatedly expressed opposition to Pride parades, characterizing such events as incompatible with traditional Christian morality and as public promotion of "non-traditional" sexual behavior in the public sphere.

Views on contraception within Orthodox theology are not dogmatically uniform, but the Serbian Orthodox Church generally discourages artificial contraception when it is perceived to separate sexual activity from its procreative purpose, although pastoral practice may vary. Abortion is strongly condemned as a grave moral sin and is regarded as the deliberate taking of human life from conception.

Euthanasia and assisted suicide are rejected on the basis that human life is sacred and belongs to God.

== Church architecture ==
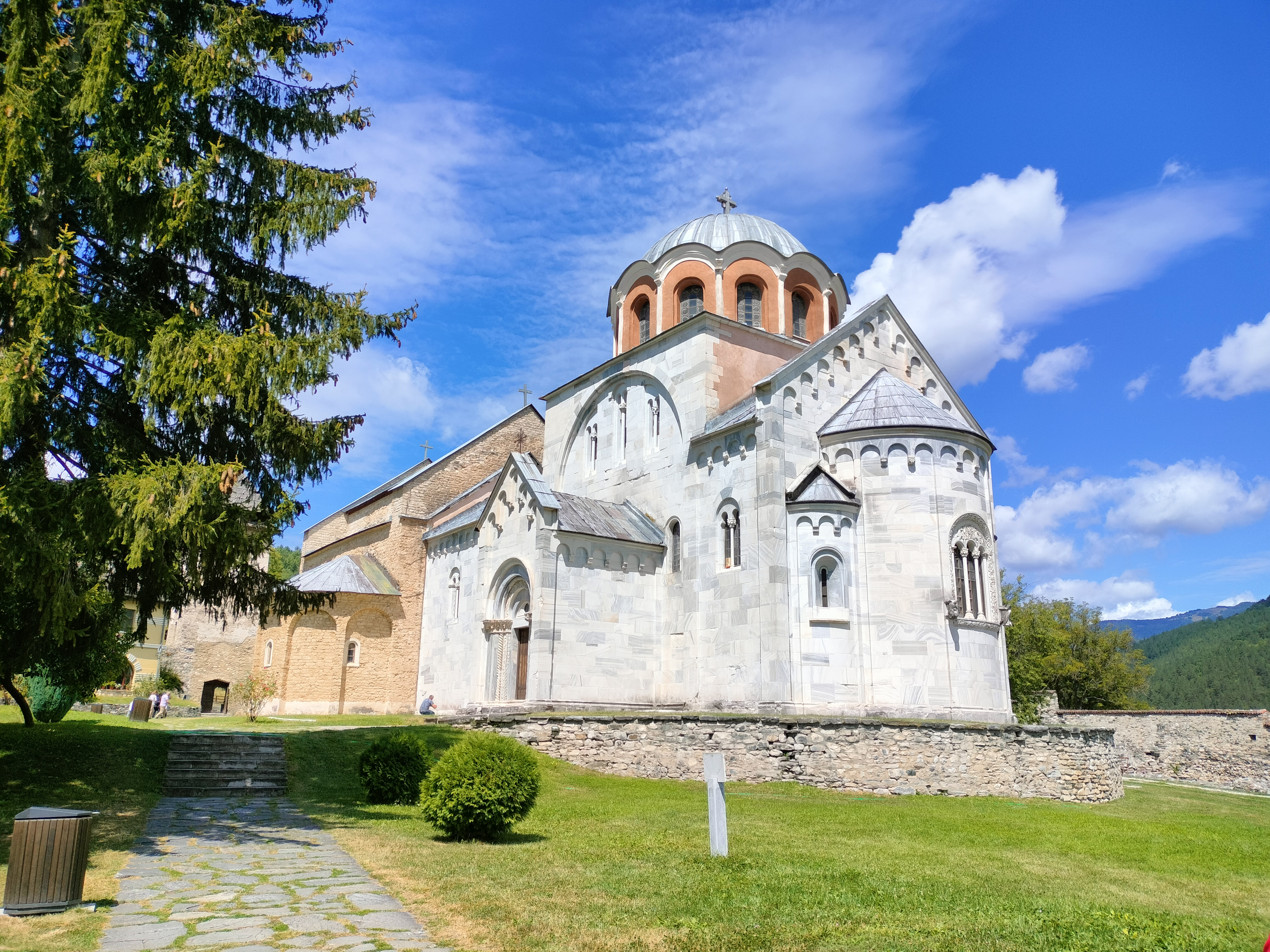
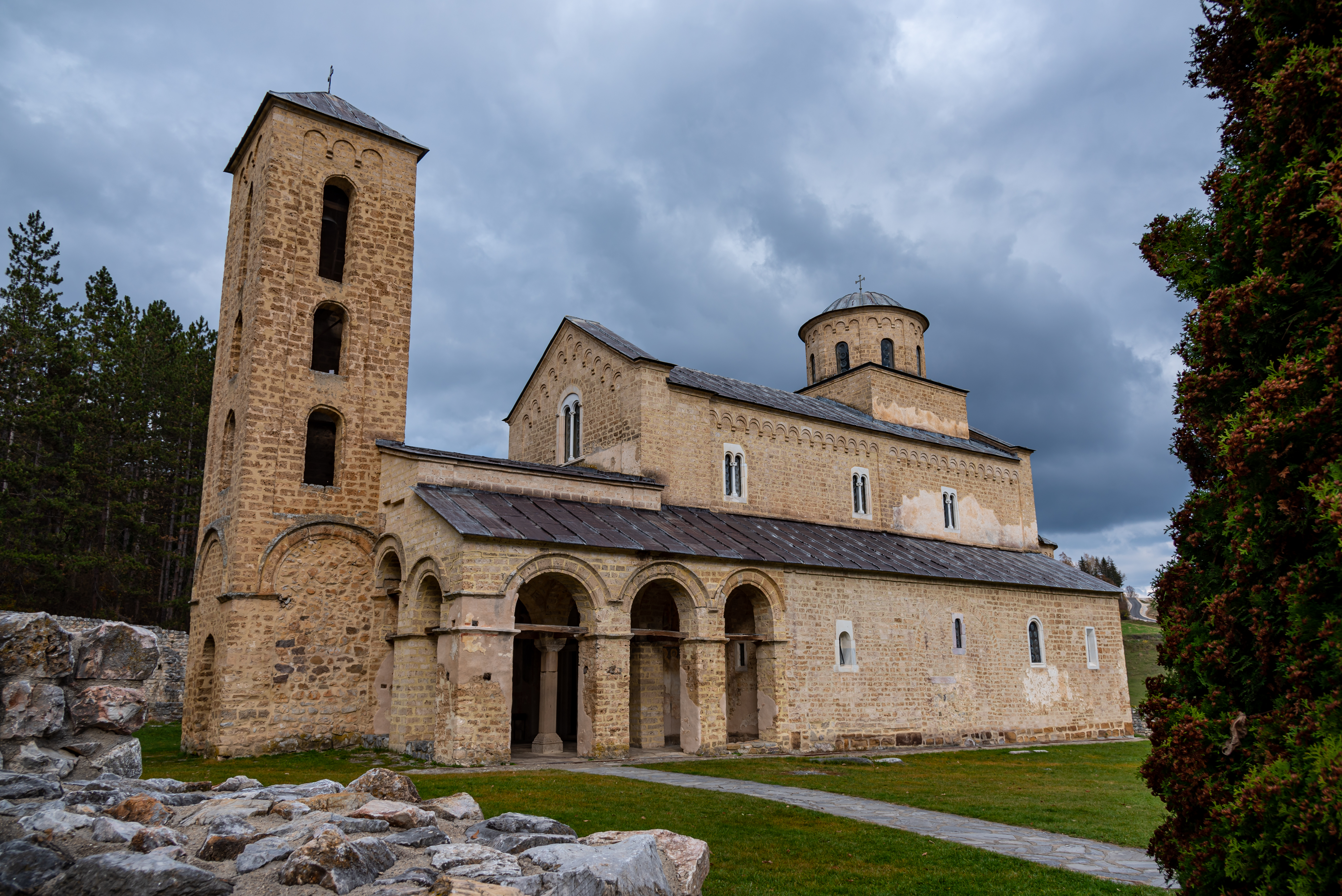
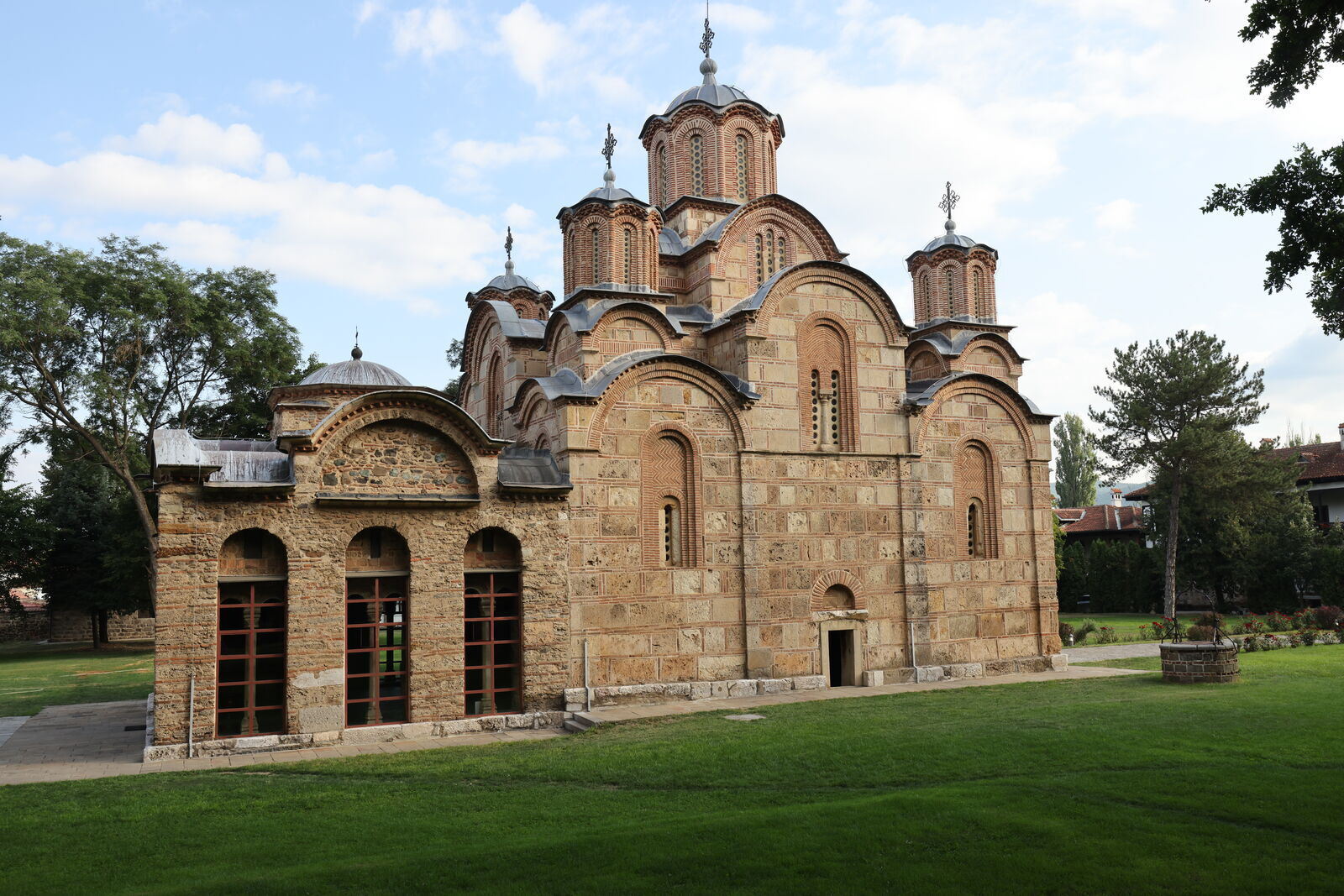
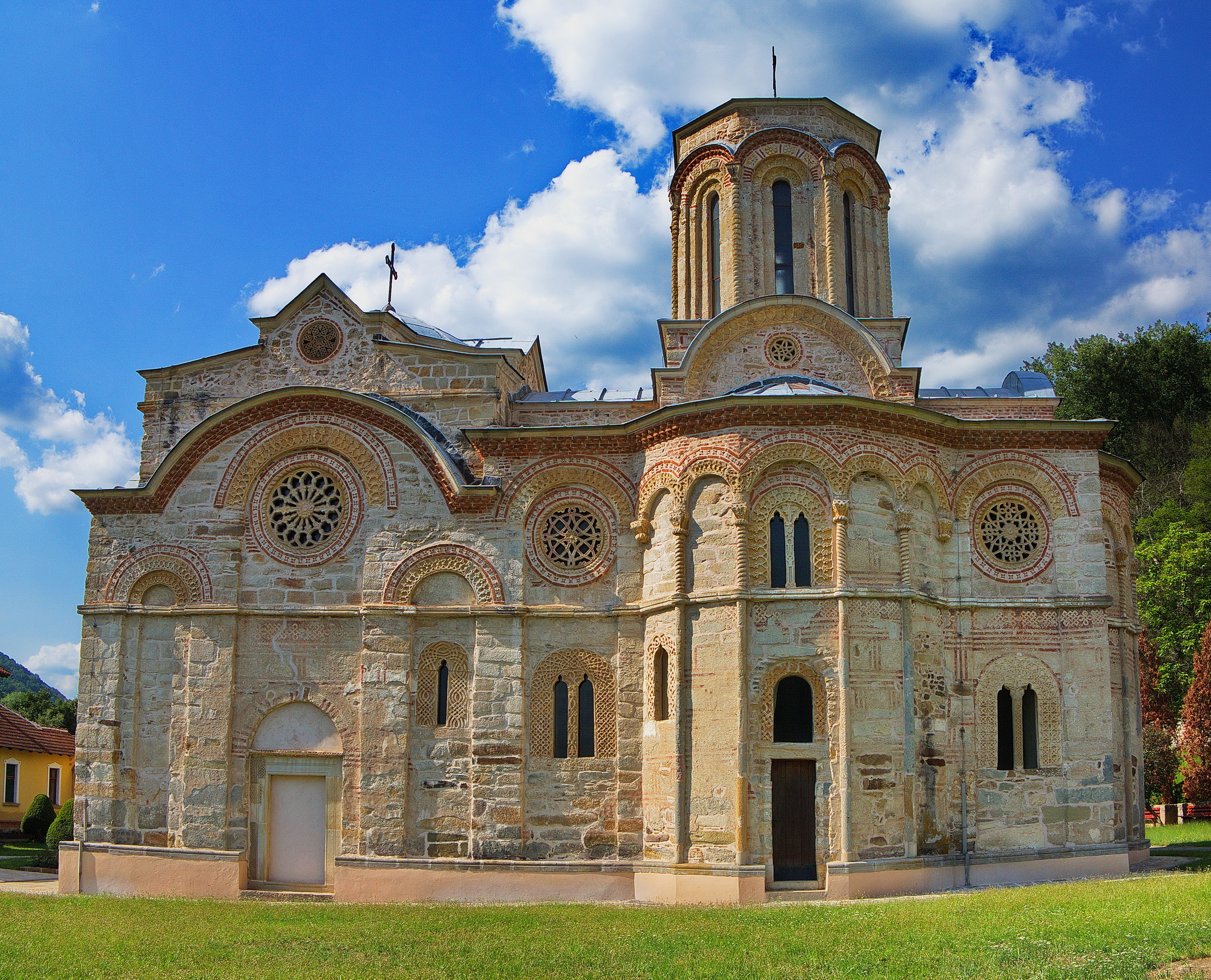
Medieval Serbian church architecture (clockwise from top left): 12th-century Studenica; 13th-century Sopoćani; 14th-century Gračanica; 15th-century Ljubostinja.

Serbian church architecture developed within the broader tradition of Byzantine architecture, while gradually creating distinctive regional forms. The earliest school of Serbian church architecture was the Raška style, which flourished from the late 12th to the late 13th century and combined Byzantine spatial concepts with elements of Romanesque architecture. Characterized by monumental single-nave churches with domes and austere marble façades, the style is exemplified by monastery churches of Studenica, Žiča, and Sopoćani.

During the 14th century, Serbian architecture evolved into the Serbo-Byzantine style, reflecting the growing political and cultural influence of the Byzantine Empire upon the expanding Serbian state. Distinguished by complex cross-in-square plans, multiple domes, rich exterior decoration, and an increased emphasis on verticality, the style reached its peak during the reigns of the Nemanjić dynasty rulers. Representative examples include monastery churches of Gračanica, Patriarchate of Peć Monastery, and Visoki Dečani, the latter combining Byzantine and Western Gothic influences.

The final phase of medieval Serbian church architecture is represented by the Morava style, which developed after the fall of the Serbian Empire and flourished between the late 14th and mid-15th centuries. Morava churches are distinguished by highly elaborate stone ornamentation, decorative façades, richly carved rosettes, and tetraconch ground plans. Notable examples include monastery churches of Ravanica, Ljubostinja, Kalenić, and Manasija.

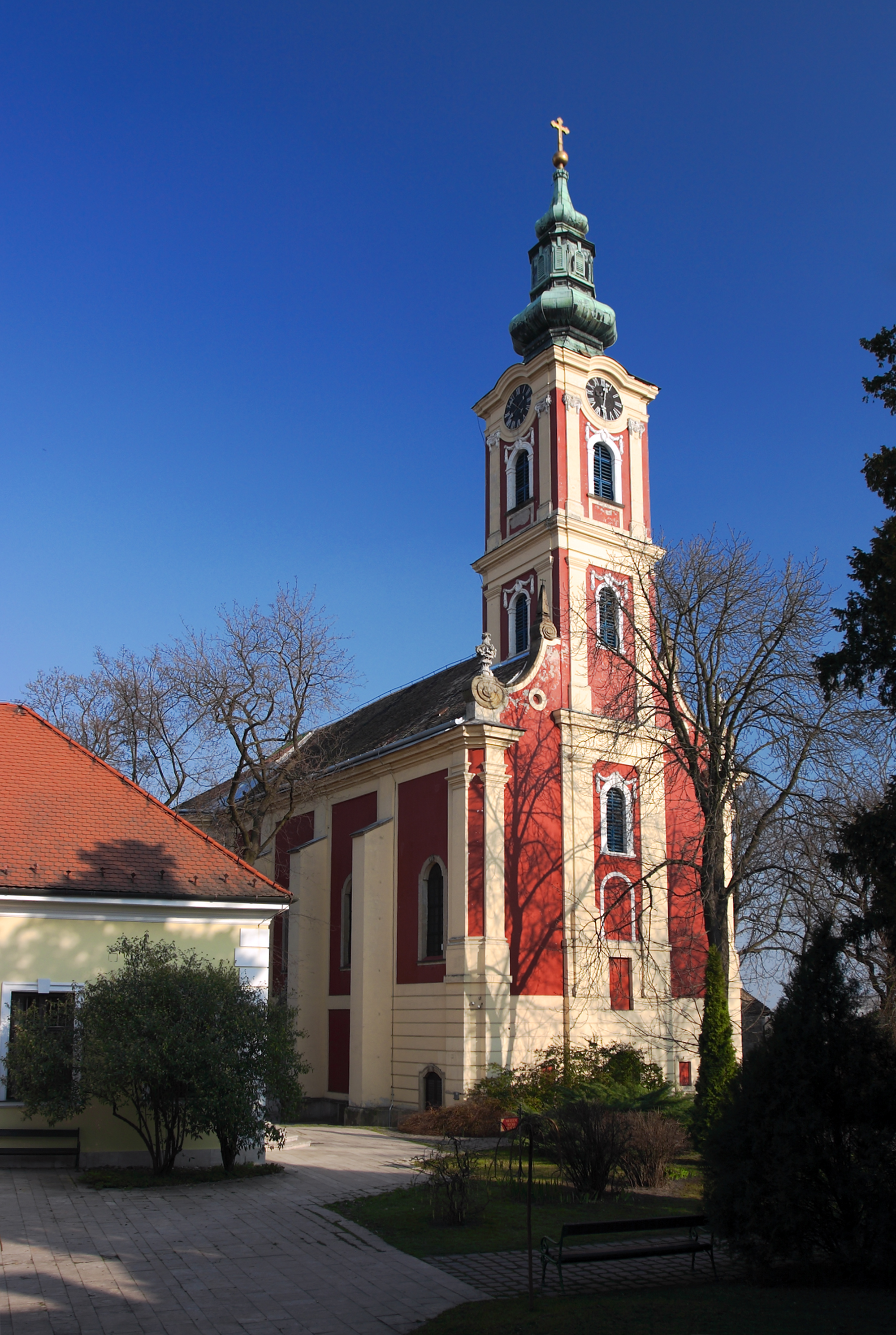
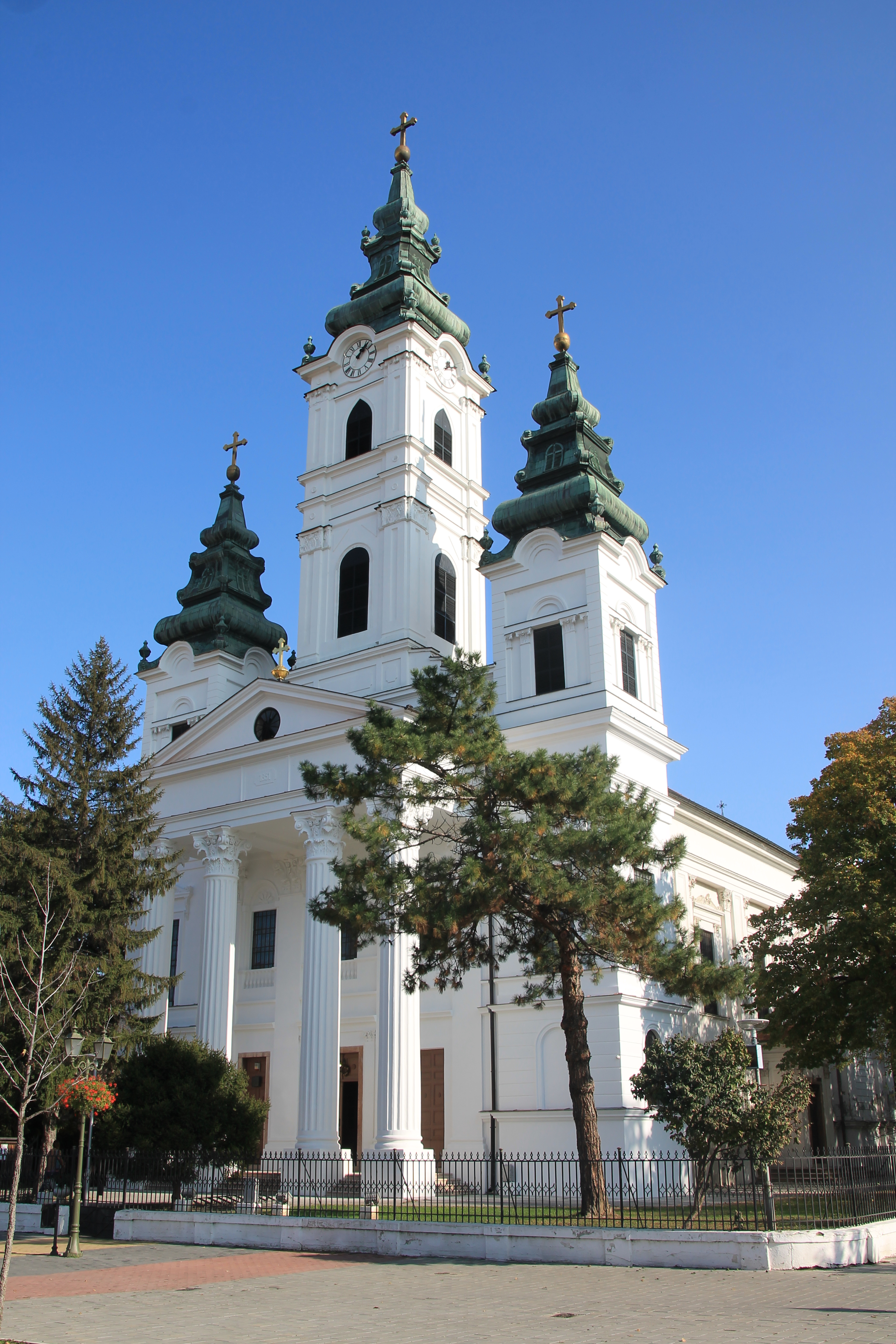
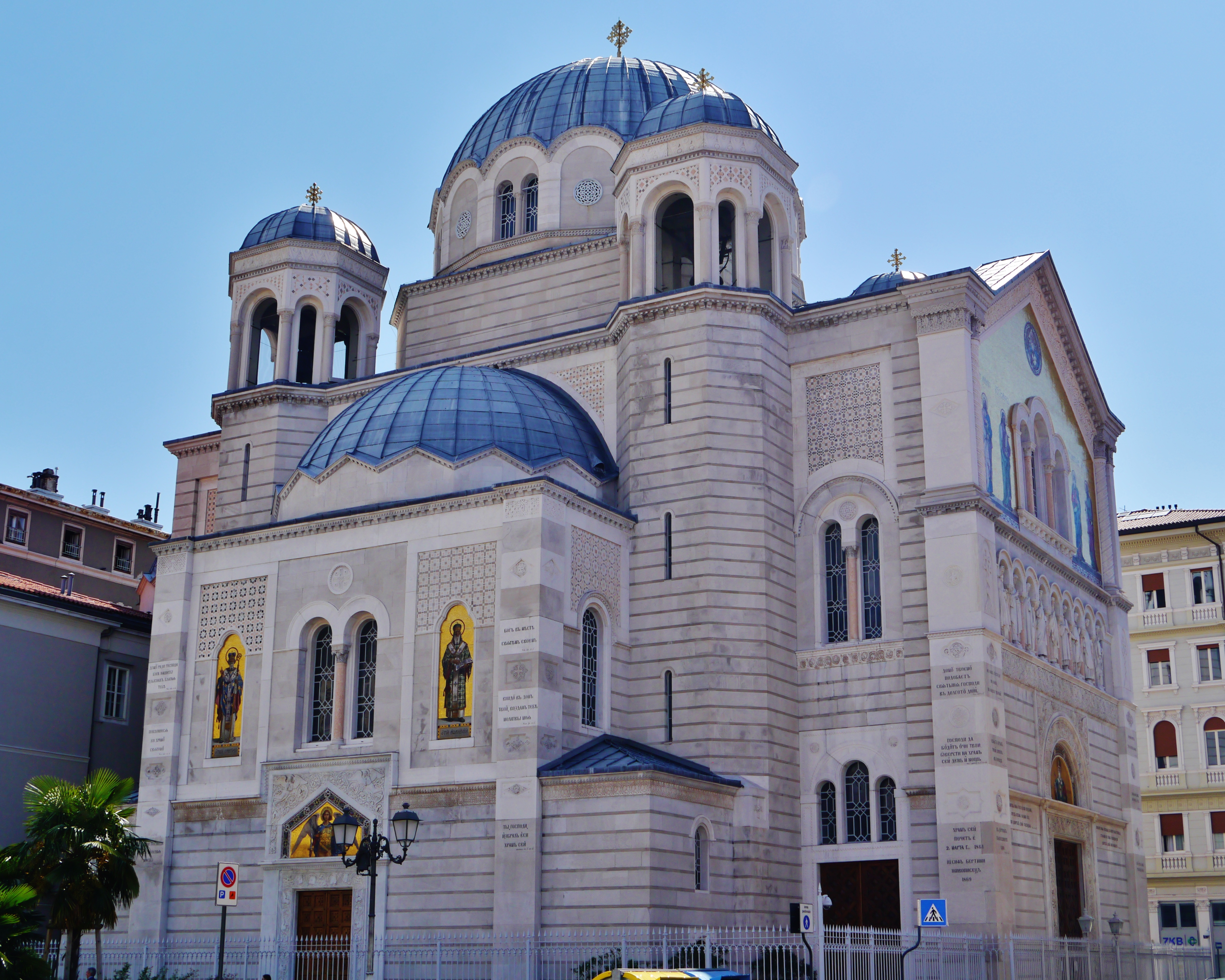
Modern Serbian church architecture (clockwise from top left): 18th-century Cathedral of the Dormition of the Theotokos in Szentendre (Hungary); 19th-century Church of Saint George in Bečej; 19th-century Church of Saint Spyridon in Trieste (Italy); 20th-century Church of Saint Mark in Belgrade.

In the coastal regions of the eastern Adriatic, particularly in Montenegro, Dalmatia, and Herzegovina, Serbian Orthodox churches often developed distinctive forms shaped by prolonged interaction with Romanesque, Gothic, and Venetian architectural traditions. These churches are generally smaller in scale and frequently incorporate features such as stone bell-gables, finely dressed limestone façades, and elements derived from local Mediterranean architecture.

Following the Great Migrations of the Serbs into the Habsburg monarchy during the late 17th and early 18th centuries, Serbian church architecture underwent significant transformation under Central European influences. The dominant style became Baroque, particularly in present-day Vojvodina and other Habsburg lands inhabited by Serbs. These churches were typically characterized by longitudinal single-nave layouts, prominent western bell towers, and richly decorated iconostases influenced by Baroque artistic traditions. Representative examples include cathedrals of St. Nicholas in Sremski Karlovci, Dormition of the Theotokos in Szentendre (Hungary), and Ascension of the Lord in Timișoara (Romania).

During the late 19th century and the especially during the interwar period, architects increasingly turned to medieval Serbian models, giving rise to the Serbo-Byzantine Revival style. Inspired primarily by the architecture of Gračanica Monastery and other monuments of the Nemanjić period, this revival produced some of the most prominent Serbian churches of the modern era, including the Church of Saint Sava and the Church of Saint Mark, both in Belgrade, as well as Church of Saint Spyridon in Trieste (Italy). Since the late 20th century, Serbo-Byzantine Revival style has become the predominant style for newly constructed Serbian Orthodox churches throughout Serbia and other territories under the jurisdiction of the Serbian Orthodox Church. As a result, even in regions such as Vojvodina, where Baroque church architecture had traditionally prevailed, most new churches have been built in the Serbo-Byzantine Revival style. This trend has been praised for reaffirming continuity with medieval Serbian architectural heritage, while some architectural historians and conservation specialists have criticized it for reducing regional architectural diversity and overlooking local historical traditions.

== Symbols and insignia ==
Flag of the Serbian Orthodox Church

The Serbian Orthodox Church possesses its own flag and coat of arms, both introduced in 1931. The flag is a Serb tricolour (a horizontal tricolour of red, blue, and white) with a golden Serbian cross in the centre. The coat of arms consists of a blue-and-white shield bearing the Tower of Saint Sava at Hilandar Monastery on the dexter (right) side and the Church of the Apostles in the Patriarchate of Peć Monastery on the sinister (left) side. In the center is a golden Serbian cross. The shield is surmounted by a golden episcopal crown and draped with the panagia of Saint Sava. Behind the shield is a patriarchal mantle of porphyry color adorned with a double golden cross on the right and an episcopal crozier on the left.

The church also awards the Order of St. Sava, an ecclesiastical decoration, which is conferred upon individuals and institutions for outstanding contributions to the church, religious life, education, culture, and humanitarian work.

== Social and charitable activities ==
The church is engaged in a range of charitable, humanitarian, and social welfare activities. Its principal humanitarian organization is Čovekoljublje ("Philanthropy"), a charitable foundation established in 1991 in response to the humanitarian crisis accompanying the breakup of Yugoslavia. During the Yugoslav Wars, it organized extensive humanitarian aid campaigns for refugees, often relying on donations collected through Serbian Orthodox parishes and organizations in the Serb diaspora. Humanitarian assistance included food, clothing, medicine, and financial support for displaced persons and communities affected by the conflicts. Since the early 2000s, the organization expanded its activities to include social care, support for vulnerable groups, and volunteer initiatives. The church also supports a network of soup kitchens, particularly in Serb enclaves in Kosovo, where several kitchens provide daily meals and other forms of assistance to socially vulnerable persons.

== Education ==
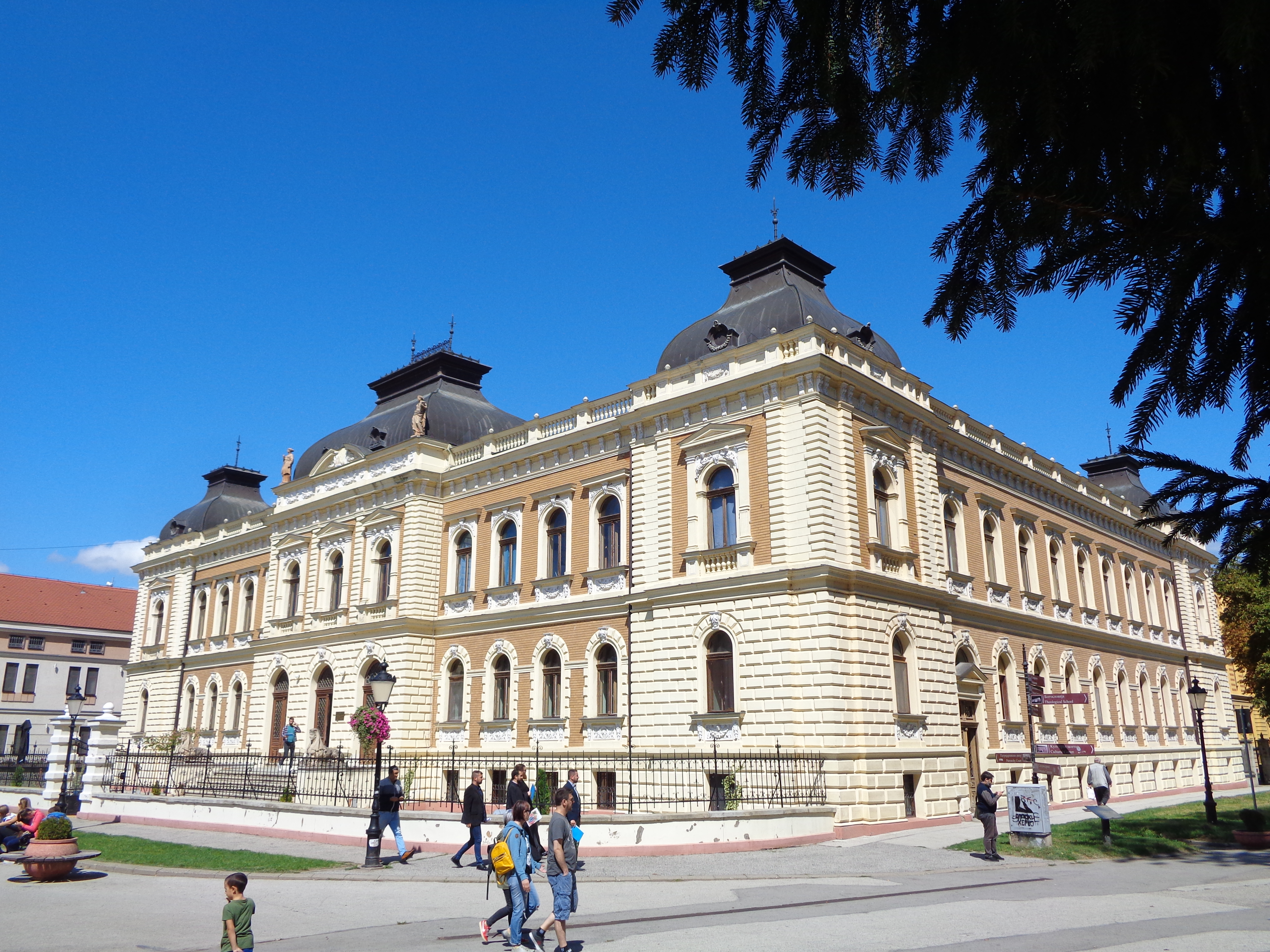
Saint Arsenije Seminary in Sremski Karlovci, founded in 1794, the second-oldest Orthodox seminary in the world

The Serbian Orthodox Church maintains a network of educational institutions dedicated to theological training and religious education. These institutions play an important role in the preservation of Orthodox theology, clergy formation, and the religious and cultural heritage of the Serbian Orthodox faithful.

Higher theological studies are conducted at the Faculty of Orthodox Theology in Belgrade and the Faculty of Orthodox Theology "Saint Basil of Ostrog" in Foča (Bosnia and Herzegovina). The church also operates 9 seminaries (eight in its canonical territory, out of which 4 are in Serbia; and one in the United States), which provide secondary-level theological education and prepare candidates for the priesthood. In addition, it oversees two secondary schools (gymnasiums) in Croatia and Montenegro, as well as three elementary schools serving Serb communities oversees (two in the United States and one in Australia).

== Media ==
The Serbian Orthodox Church operates a diverse network of media outlets that serve its religious, educational, and cultural activities. Its most prominent outlet is television channel Hram (available on cable, satellite, and IPTV), which broadcasts liturgies, religious education, cultural programs, and news related to church life. The church publishes the monthly Pravoslavlje while the children's magazine Svetosavsko zvonce is distributed to children enrolled at Orthodox religion classes organized in public elementary and secondary schools.

Numerous dioceses maintain their own radio stations, including Radio Slovo Ljubve (Archdiocese of Belgrade and Karlovci), Radio Svetigora (Metropolitanate of Montenegro and the Littoral), Radio Tavor (Eparchy of Bačka), Radio Glas (Eparchy of Niš), Radio Istočnik (Eparchy of Valjevo), Radio Zlatousti (Eparchy of Šumadija), and Radio Mileševa (Eparchy of Mileševa). In addition to traditional media, the church disseminates information through social media platforms.

== See also ==
- Eastern Orthodoxy in Serbia
- Eastern Orthodoxy in Bosnia and Herzegovina
- Eastern Orthodoxy in Montenegro
- Eastern Orthodoxy in Croatia

== Sources ==
- Abramović, Anja (2019). "Women's Issues in Serbian Orthodox Church". Religion and Tolerance: Journal of the Center for Empirical Researches of Religion. 17 (32): 243–262. Archived from the original on 18 July 2020.
- Bataković, Dušan T., ed. (2005). Histoire du peuple serbe [History of the Serbian People] (in French). Lausanne: L’Age d’Homme. ISBN 9782825119587. Archived from the original on 29 September 2024.
- Bataković, Dušan T. (2007). "Surviving in Ghetto-like Enclaves: The Serbs of Kosovo and Metohija 1999-2007" (PDF). Kosovo and Metohija: Living in the Enclave. Belgrade: Institute for Balkan Studies. pp. 239–263. Archived (PDF) from the original on 31 January 2021.
- Bataković, Dušan T. (2017). "The Case of Kosovo: Separation vs. Integration: Legacy, Identity, Nationalism". Studia Środkowoeuropejskie i Bałkanistyczne. 26: 105–123. Archived from the original on 1 April 2022.
- Birnbaum, Henrik (1972). "Byzantine Tradition Transformed: The Old Serbian Vita". Aspects of the Balkans: Continuity and Change. The Hague and Paris: Mouton. pp. 243–284. Archived from the original on 1 August 2021.
- Buchenau, Klaus (2014). "The Serbian Orthodox Church". Eastern Christianity and Politics in the Twenty-First Century. London-New York: Routledge. pp. 67–93. ISBN 9781317818663.
- Čanak-Medić, Milka; Todić, Branislav (2017). The Monastery of the Patriarchate of Peć. Novi Sad: Platoneum, Beseda. ISBN 9788685869839.
- Carter, Francis W. (1969). "An Analysis of the Medieval Serbian Oecumene: A Theoretical Approach". Geografiska Annaler. Series B: Human Geography. 51 (1–2): 39–56. doi:10.1080/04353684.1969.11879331.
- Ćirković, Sima; Korać, Vojislav; Babić, Gordana (1986). Studenica Monastery. Belgrade: Jugoslovenska revija.
- Ćirković, Sima (2004). The Serbs. Malden: Blackwell Publishing. ISBN 9781405142915. Archived from the original on 11 March 2025.
- Ćirković, Sima (2014) [1964]. "The Double Wreath: A Contribution to the History of Kingship in Bosnia". Balcanica (45): 107–143. doi:10.2298/BALC1445107C.
- Crnčević, Dejan (2013). "Architecture of Cathedral Churches on the Eastern Adriatic Coast at the Time of the First Principalities of South Slavs (9th-11th Centuries)". The World of the Slavs: Studies of the East, West and South Slavs: Civitas, Oppidas, Villas and Archeological Evidence (7th to 11th Centuries AD). Belgrade: The Institute for History. pp. 37–136. ISBN 9788677431044.
- Ćurčić, Slobodan (1979). Gračanica: King Milutin's Church and Its Place in Late Byzantine Architecture. Pennsylvania State University Press. ISBN 9780271002187.
- Daskalov, Rumen; Marinov, Tchavdar, eds. (2013). Entangled Histories of the Balkans: Volume One: National Ideologies and Language Policies. BRILL. ISBN 9789004250765.
- Đorđević, Života; Pejić, Svetlana, eds. (1999). Cultural Heritage of Kosovo and Metohija. Belgrade: Institute for the Protection of Cultural Monuments of the Republic of Serbia. ISBN 9788680879161.
- Dragojlović, Dragoljub (1993). "Serbian Spirituality in the 13th and 14th Centuries and Western Scholasticism". Serbs in European Civilization. Belgrade: Nova, Serbian Academy of Sciences and Arts, Institute for Balkan Studies. pp. 32–40. ISBN 9788675830153.
- Dvornik, Francis (1962). The Slavs in European History and Civilization. New Brunswick: Rutgers University Press.
- Ferjančić, Božidar; Maksimović, Ljubomir (2014). "Sava Nemanjić and Serbia between Epiros and Nicaea". Balcanica (45): 37–54. doi:10.2298/BALC1445037F. hdl:21.15107/rcub_dais_12894.
- Fine, John Van Antwerp Jr. (1991) [1983]. The Early Medieval Balkans: A Critical Survey from the Sixth to the Late Twelfth Century. Ann Arbor, Michigan: University of Michigan Press. ISBN 0472081497.
- Fine, John Van Antwerp Jr. (1994) [1987]. The Late Medieval Balkans: A Critical Survey from the Late Twelfth Century to the Ottoman Conquest. Ann Arbor, Michigan: University of Michigan Press. ISBN 0472082604. Archived from the original on 25 December 2024.
- Fine, John Van Antwerp Jr. (2005). When Ethnicity did not Matter in the Balkans: A Study of Identity in Pre-Nationalist Croatia, Dalmatia, and Slavonia in the Medieval and Early-Modern Periods. Ann Arbor, Michigan: University of Michigan Press. ISBN 0472025600.
- Fotić, Aleksandar (2008). "Serbian Orthodox Church". Encyclopedia of the Ottoman Empire. New York: Infobase Publishing. pp. 519–520. ISBN 9781438110257.
- Gavrilović, Zaga (2001). Studies in Byzantine and Serbian Medieval Art. London: The Pindar Press. ISBN 9781899828340.
- Ivanović, Miloš (2019). "Serbian Hagiographies on the Warfare and Political Struggles of the Nemanjić Dynasty (from the Twelfth to Fourteenth Century)". Reform and Renewal in Medieval East and Central Europe: Politics, Law and Society. Cluj-Napoca: Romanian Academy, Center for Transylvanian Studies. pp. 103–129. Archived from the original on 1 November 2021.
- Jagić, Vatroslav (1883). Quattuor Evangeliorum versionis palaeoslovenicae Codex Marianus Glagoliticus, characteribus Cyrillicis transcriptum (PDF). Berlin: Weidmann.
- Janićijević, Jovan, ed. (1990). Serbian Culture Through Centuries: Selected List of Recommended Reading. Belgrade: Yugoslav Authors' Agency.
- Janićijević, Jovan, ed. (1998). The Cultural Treasury of Serbia. Belgrade: Idea, Vojnoizdavački zavod, Markt system. ISBN 9788675470397.
- Johnston, Douglas; Sampson, Cynthia, eds. (1995). Religion, the Missing Dimension of Statecraft. New York & Oxford: Oxford University Press. ISBN 9780195102802.
- Jovanović, Zdravko B. (2019). "Ecclesiology in Contemporary Serbian Theology: An Overview of some Important Perspectives". Die Serbische Orthodoxe Kirche in den Herausforderungen des 21. Jahrhunderts. Regensburg: Pustet. pp. 169–187. ISBN 9783791730578.
- Kalić, Jovanka (2017). "The First Coronation Churches of Medieval Serbia". Balcanica (48): 7–18. doi:10.2298/BALC1748007K. hdl:21.15107/rcub_dais_4886.
- Kia, Mehrdad (2011). Daily Life in the Ottoman Empire. Santa Barbara, California: Greenwood Press. ISBN 9780313064029.
- Kidd, Beresford James (1927). The Churches of Eastern Christendom: From A.D. 451 to the Present Time. London: Faith Press.
- Kiminas, Demetrius (2009). The Ecumenical Patriarchate: A History of Its Metropolitanates with Annotated Hierarch Catalogs. Wildside Press LLC. ISBN 9781434458766.
- Komatina, Ivana (2016). Црква и држава у српским земљама од XI до XIII века [Church and State in the Serbian Lands from the XIth to the XIIIth Century]. Београд: Institute of History. ISBN 9788677431136.
- Komatina, Predrag (2015). "The Church in Serbia at the Time of Cyrilo-Methodian Mission in Moravia". Cyril and Methodius: Byzantium and the World of the Slavs. Thessaloniki: Dimos. pp. 711–718. Archived from the original on 2 September 2021.
- Krstić, Branislav (2003). Saving the Cultural Heritage of Serbia and Europe in Kosovo and Metohia. Belgrade: Coordination Center of the Federal Government and the Government of the Republic of Serbia for Kosovo and Metohia. ISBN 9788675560173.
- Kuburić, Zorica (2014). "Serbian Orthodox Church in the Context of History" (PDF). Religion and Tolerance: Journal of the Center for Empirical Researches of Religion. 12 (22): 387–402. Archived (PDF) from the original on 24 July 2021.
- Ljubinković, Radivoje (1975). The Church of the Apostles in the Patriarchate of Peć. Belgrade: Jugoslavija.
- Marjanović, Dragoljub (2018). "Emergence of the Serbian Church in Relation to Byzantium and Rome" (PDF). Niš and Byzantium. 16: 41–50. Archived (PDF) from the original on 23 September 2019.
- Marjanović-Dušanić, Smilja (2006). "Lʹ idéologie monarchique dans les chartes de la dynastie serbe des Némanides (1168-1371): Étude diplomatique". Archiv für Diplomatik: Schriftgeschichte, Siegel- und Wappenkunde. 52: 149–158. doi:10.7788/afd.2006.52.jg.149. S2CID 96483243. Archived from the original on 4 November 2021.
- Marković, Miodrag; Vojvodić, Dragan, eds. (2017). Serbian Artistic Heritage in Kosovo and Metohija: Identity, Significance, Vulnerability. Belgrade: Serbian Academy of Sciences and Arts.
- Medaković, Dejan (1989). "Die Serbische Kirche und die Kunst im 18. und 19. Jahrhundert". Tradition and Modern Society: A Symposium at the Royal Academy of Letters, History, and Antiquities. Stockholm: Almqvist & Wiksell International. pp. 133–147. ISBN 9789174022025.
- Mileusnić, Slobodan, ed. (1989). Serbian Orthodox Church: Its past and present. Vol. 7. Belgrade: Serbian Orthodox Church.
- Mileusnić, Slobodan (1997). Spiritual Genocide: A survey of destroyed, damaged and desecrated churches, monasteries and other church buildings during the war 1991–1995 (1997). Belgrade: Museum of the Serbian Orthodox Church.
- Mileusnić, Slobodan (1998). Medieval Monasteries of Serbia (4th ed.). Novi Sad: Prometej. ISBN 9788676393701.
- Moravcsik, Gyula, ed. (1967) [1949]. Constantine Porphyrogenitus: De Administrando Imperio (2nd revised ed.). Washington D.C.: Dumbarton Oaks Center for Byzantine Studies. ISBN 9780884020219.
- Morrison, Kenneth; Čagorović, Nebojša (2014). "The Political Dynamics of Intra-Orthodox Conflict in Montenegro". Politicization of Religion, the Power of State, Nation, and Faith: The Case of Former Yugoslavia and its Successor States. New York: Palgrave Macmillan. pp. 151–170. ISBN 9781137477866.
- Obolensky, Dimitri (1974) [1971]. The Byzantine Commonwealth: Eastern Europe, 500-1453. London: Cardinal. ISBN 9780351176449. Archived from the original on 30 September 2024.
- Pantelić, Bratislav (2002). The Architecture of Dečani and the Role of Archbishop Danilo II. Wiesbaden: Reichert. ISBN 9783895002397.
- Pavlović, Jovan, ed. (1992). Serbian Orthodox Church: Its past and present. Vol. 8. Belgrade: Serbian Orthodox Church.
- Pavlovich, Paul (1989). The History of the Serbian Orthodox Church. Serbian Heritage Books. ISBN 9780969133124.
- Pavlowitch, Stevan K. (2002). Serbia: The History behind the Name. London: Hurst & Company. ISBN 9781850654773. Archived from the original on 11 March 2025.
- Perica, Vjekoslav (2002). Balkan Idols: Religion and Nationalism in Yugoslav States. Oxford University Press.
- Popović, Marko (1999). Tvrđava Ras [The Fortress of Ras] (in Serbian). Belgrade: Archaeological Institute. ISBN 9788680093147. Archived from the original on 8 January 2024.
- Popović, Radomir V. (1996). Le Christianisme sur le sol de l'Illyricum oriental jusqu'à l'arrivée des Slaves. Thessaloniki: Institute for Balkan Studies. ISBN 9789607387103.
- Popović, Radomir V. (2013). Serbian Orthodox Church in History. Belgrade: Academy of Serbian Orthodox Church for Fine Arts and Conservation. ISBN 9788686805621.
- Popović, Svetlana (2002). "The Serbian Episcopal Sees in the Thirteenth Century". Старинар (51: 2001): 171–184.
- Prinzing, Günter (2012). "The autocephalous Byzantine ecclesiastical province of Bulgaria/Ohrid. How independent were its archbishops?". Bulgaria Mediaevalis. 3: 355–383. ISSN 1314-2941.
- Radić, Radmila (1998). "Serbian Orthodox Church and the War in Bosnia and Herzegovina". Religion and the War in Bosnia. Atlanta: Scholars Press. pp. 160–182. ISBN 9780788504280.
- Radić, Radmila (2007). "Serbian Christianity". The Blackwell Companion to Eastern Christianity. Malden: Blackwell Publishing. pp. 231–248. ISBN 9780470766392.
- Radić, Radmila (2015). "The Serbian Orthodox Church in the First World War". The Serbs and the First World War 1914-1918. Belgrade: Serbian Academy of Sciences and Arts. pp. 263–285. ISBN 9788670256590.
- Radić, Radmila (2002). Država i verske zajednice 1945–1970. Biblioteka Studije i monografije (in Serbian). Vol. 1–2. Beograd: Institut za noviju istoriju Srbije. ISBN 9788670050327.
- Radić, Radmila; Vukomanović, Milan (2014). "Religion and Democracy in Serbia since 1989: The Case of the Serbian Orthodox Church". Religion and Politics in Post-socialist Central and Southeastern Europe: Challenges since 1989. Houndmills: Palgrave Macmillan. pp. 180–211. ISBN 9781137330727.
- Radojević, Mira; Mićić, Srđan B. (2015). "Serbian Orthodox Church cooperation and frictions with Ecumenical Patriarchate of Constantinople and Bulgarian Exarchate during interwar period". Studia Academica šumenesia. 2: 126‒143. Archived from the original on 13 May 2022.
- Roudometof, Victor (2001). Nationalism, Globalization, and Orthodoxy: The Social Origins of Ethnic Conflict in the Balkans. London: Greenwood Press. ISBN 9780313319495.
- Runciman, Steven (1985). The Great Church in captivity: A study of the Patriarchate of Constantinople from the eve of the Turkish conquest to the Greek War of Independence. Cambridge University Press. ISBN 9780521313100.
- Šakota, Mirjana (2017). Ottoman Chronicles: Dečani Monastery Archives. Prizren: Diocese of Raška-Prizren.
- Samardžić, Radovan; Duškov, Milan, eds. (1993). Serbs in European Civilization. Belgrade: Nova, Serbian Academy of Sciences and Arts, Institute for Balkan Studies. ISBN 9788675830153.
- Sedlar, Jean W. (1994). East Central Europe in the Middle Ages, 1000-1500. Seattle: University of Washington Press. ISBN 9780295800646. Archived from the original on 23 May 2023.
- Slijepčević, Đoko M. (1958). The Macedonian Question: The Struggle for Southern Serbia. Chicago: The American Institute for Balkan Affairs.
- Sotirović, Vladislav B. (2011). "The Serbian Patriarchate of Peć in the Ottoman Empire: The First Phase (1557–94)". Serbian Studies Journal of the North American Society for Serbian Studies. 25 (2): 143–169. doi:10.1353/ser.2011.0038. Archived from the original on 20 November 2022.
- Soulis, George Christos (1984). The Serbs and Byzantium during the reign of Tsar Stephen Dušan (1331–1355) and his successors. Washington: Dumbarton Oaks Library and Collection. ISBN 9780884021377.
- Spasović, Stanimir (2004). "Serbian Orthodoxy in Canada". Diaspora Serbs: A Cultural Analysis. Edmonton: University of Alberta. pp. 95–168. ISBN 9780921490159.
- Spasović, Stanimir (1988). Uloga Srpske crkve u nacionalnom oslobođenju. Istočnik.
- Špehar, Perica N. (2010). "By Their Fruit you will recognize them - Christianization of Serbia in Middle Ages". Tak więc po owocach poznacie ich. Poznań: Stowarzyszenie naukowe archeologów Polskich. pp. 203–220. Archived from the original on 2 September 2021.
- Špehar, Perica N. (2015). "Remarks to Christianisation and Realms in the Central Balkans in the Light of Archaeological Finds (7th-11th c.)". Castellum, Civitas, Urbs: Centres and Elites in Early Medieval East-Central Europe. Budapest: Verlag Marie Leidorf. pp. 71–93. Archived from the original on 2 September 2021.
- Stephenson, Paul (2000). Byzantium's Balkan Frontier: A Political Study of the Northern Balkans, 900–1204. Cambridge: Cambridge University Press. ISBN 9780521770170.
- Stojanović, Aleksandar (2017). "A Beleaguered Church: The Serbian Orthodox Church in the Independent State of Croatia (NDH) 1941-1945". Balcanica (48): 269–287. doi:10.2298/BALC1748269S.
- Subotić, Gojko (1998). Art of Kosovo: The Sacred Land. New York: The Monacelli Press. ISBN 9781580930062.
- Šuica, Marko (2011). "The Image of the Battle of Kosovo (1389) Today: a Historic Event, a Moral Pattern, or the Tool of Political Manipulation". The Uses of the Middle Ages in Modern European States: History, Nationhood and the Search for Origins. New York: Palgrave Macmillan. pp. 152–174. ISBN 9780230283107.
- Todić, Branislav (1999). Serbian Medieval Painting: The Age of King Milutin. Belgrade: Draganić. ISBN 9788644102717.
- Todić, Branislav; Čanak-Medić, Milka (2013). The Dečani Monastery. Belgrade: Museum in Priština. ISBN 9788651916536.
- Thomson, Francis J. (1993). "Archbishop Daniel II of Serbia: Hierarch, Hagiographer, Saint: With Some Comments on the Vitae regum et archiepiscoporum Serbiae and the Cults of Mediaeval Serbian Saints". Analecta Bollandiana. 111 (1–2): 103–134. doi:10.1484/J.ABOL.4.03279.
- Todorović, Jelena (2006). An Orthodox Festival Book in the Habsburg Empire: Zaharija Orfelin's Festive Greeting to Mojsej Putnik (1757). Aldershot: Ashgate Publishing. ISBN 9780754656111.
- Todorovic, Milos (2024). "Orthodoxy in Diplomacy: An Overview of the Serbian Orthodox Church's Religious Diplomacy and Role in International Relations". Journal of Balkan and Black Sea Studies (12): 103–130. doi:10.56679/balkar.1449077.
- Tomić, Marko D. (2019). "The View on the Legal Position of the Serbian Orthodox Church in Bosnia and Herzegovina under the rule of the Austro-Hungarian Empire" (PDF). Зборник Радова: Правни Факултет У Новом Саду. 53 (4): 1445–1465. Archived (PDF) from the original on 2 September 2021.
- Treadgold, Warren T. (1997). A History of the Byzantine State and Society. Stanford, CA: Stanford University Press. ISBN 9780804726306. Archived from the original on 8 October 2024.
- Turlej, Stanisław (2016). Justiniana Prima: An Underestimated Aspect of Justinian's Church Policy. Krakow: Jagiellonian University Press. ISBN 9788323395560.
- Ubiparipović, Srboljub (2019). "Development of Liturgiology among the Orthodox Serbs and its Impact on Actual Liturgical Renewal in the Serbian Orthodox Church". Die Serbische Orthodoxe Kirche in den Herausforderungen des 21. Jahrhunderts. Regensburg: Pustet. pp. 258–267. ISBN 9783791730578.
- Vásáry, István (2005). Cumans and Tatars: Oriental Military in the Pre-Ottoman Balkans, 1185–1365. Cambridge: Cambridge University Press. ISBN 9781139444088.
- Velikonja, Mitja (2003). Religious Separation and Political Intolerance in Bosnia-Herzegovina. College Station, TX: Texas A&M University Press. ISBN 9781603447249.
- Vlasto, Alexis P. (1970). The Entry of the Slavs into Christendom: An Introduction to the Medieval History of the Slavs. Cambridge: Cambridge University Press. ISBN 9780521074599.
- Vuković, Sava (1998). History of the Serbian Orthodox Church in America and Canada 1891–1941. Kragujevac: Kalenić.
- Ware, Kallistos (1993). The Orthodox Church: An Introduction to Eastern Christianity. Penguin Books. ISBN 9780141925004.
- Živković, Tibor; Bojanin, Stanoje; Petrović, Vladeta, eds. (2000). Selected Charters of Serbian Rulers (XII-XV Century): Relating to the Territory of Kosovo and Metohia. Athens: Center for Studies of Byzantine Civilisation.
- Živković, Tibor (2007). "The Golden Seal of Stroimir" (PDF). Historical Review. 55. Belgrade: The Institute for History: 23–29. Archived from the original (PDF) on 24 March 2018.
- Živković, Tibor (2008). Forging unity: The South Slavs between East and West 550-1150. Belgrade: The Institute of History, Čigoja štampa. ISBN 9788675585732.
- Živković, Tibor (2010). "Constantine Porphyrogenitus' Source on the Earliest History of the Croats and Serbs". Radovi Zavoda Za Hrvatsku Povijest U Zagrebu. 42: 117–131.
- Živković, Tibor (2012). De conversione Croatorum et Serborum: A Lost Source. Belgrade: The Institute of History. Archived from the original on 13 February 2021.
- Živković, Tibor (2013a). "On the Baptism of the Serbs and Croats in the Time of Basil I (867–886)" (PDF). Studia Slavica et Balcanica Petropolitana (1): 33–53. Archived (PDF) from the original on 20 November 2018.
