= Zaharias =

Zaharias is a surname. Notable people with the surname include:

- Alexandra Zaharias (1929–2024), American ballet teacher
- Babe Didrikson Zaharias (1911–1956), American athlete
- George Zaharias (1908–1984), American professional wrestler and sports promoter

== See also ==
- Zaharia
