= Ecclesiastical government =

Ecclesiastical government, ecclesiastical hierarchy, or ecclesiocracy may refer to:

- Theocracy, a form of religious State government
- Hierocracy (medieval), papal temporal supremacy over the State
- Ecclesiastical polity, the government of a Christian denomination
  - Hierarchy of the Catholic Church
- Ecclesiastical jurisdiction, jurisdiction by church leaders over other church leaders and over the laity
- Consistory (Protestantism)
- Consistory (Judaism)
- Papal consistory

== See also ==
- Canonical territory
- Ecclesiastical state (disambiguation)
