= Zaharia =

Zaharia is an Albanian and Romanian variant form of the given name or surname Zechariah/Zacharias.

== Notable people with this surname ==
- Zaharia family, an Albanian noble family
  - Koja Zaharia
  - Lekë Zaharia
  - Elia Zaharia
- Alexandru Zaharia, Romanian footballer
- Alejandro Argudín-Zaharia, Romanian-Cuban athlete
- Alin Zaharia, Romanian footballer
- Dorel Zaharia, Romanian footballer
- Dorin Liviu Zaharia, Romanian singer
- Maria Zaharia, Romanian girl killed in World War I
- Matei Zaharia, Romanian-Canadian computer scientist
- Radu Zaharia, Romanian footballer

== Notable people with this given name ==
- Zaharia Bârsan, Romanian actor and playwright
- Zaharia Carcalechi, Romanian publisher
- Zaharia Stancu, Romanian writer

== See also ==
- Zaharija, usual transliteration of the name from Serbian Cyrillic
- Zaharias
