= Ecclesiastical state =

The term ecclesiastical state can refer to:

- A state that is a theocracy
- A state, such as a prince-bishopric, in which secular sovereignty is constitutionally assigned to a high religious dignitary

== See also ==
- Ecclesiastical government (disambiguation)
