= Zaharija =

Zaharija (Serbian Cyrillic: Захаријa) is a Serbian name, a variant of the Biblical name Zachary, through Greek Zacharias.

Variant transliterations into the Latin alphabet include Zaharia and Zaharije.

== Notable people with this name ==
- Zaharija Dečanac, Metropolitan of Raška and Prizren (1819–1830)
- Zaharija of Serbia (890s–924), medieval Prince
- Zaharije Orfelin (1726–1785), Serb polymath
- Zaharija Trnavčević, leader of current Serbian political party Rich Serbia

== See also ==
- Zaharia
