= Canonical territory =

Ecclesial territorial administration

A canonical territory is, in some Christian denominations, a geographical area seen as belonging to a particular bishop or Church as its own when it comes to ecclesiastical matters, whether by tradition or by canon law. The concept is found both in the Eastern Orthodox Church and Catholic Church.

According to Andriy Mykhaleyko, the expression "canonical territory" is "rather difficult to define as it can refer to a variety of different aspects, from an ecclesiological, geographical, and cultural entity to the territorial or canonical jurisdiction of a church as an expression of its local community, or the pastoral theological care of the faithful in a particular territory."

== Historical background ==
=== Canons of the Apostles ===
Bishop Hilarion Alfeyev, of the Russian Orthodox Church, asserts that:

[t]he model of church organization that was formed during the first three centuries of Christianity was based on the principle of "one city-one bishop-one Church", which foresaw the assignment of a certain ecclesiastical territory to one concrete bishop." In accordance with this principle, the "Canons of the Apostles" and other canonical decrees of the ancient Church point to the inadmissibility of violating the boundaries of ecclesiastical territories by bishops or clergy.

Some canons of the Canons of the Apostles state that:

1. the bishop should not leave his diocese and go over to another without authorization (can. 14);
2. the bishop may not ordain outside the boundaries of his diocese (can. 35);
3. when transferring to another city, excommunicated clergymen or laymen cannot be accepted into communion by another bishop (can. 12);
4. clergymen who go over to another diocese without the consent of their bishop are deprived of the right to serve (can. 15);
5. prohibition of serving or excommunication of a clergyman imposed by one bishop cannot by removed by another bishop (can. 16, 32).

"In defining the boundaries of ecclesiastical territories, the Fathers of the ancient undivided Church took into account civil territorial divisions established by secular authorities," according to Alfeyev. He adds: "[a]lthough the principle of having ecclesiastical territories correspond to civil ones was accepted as a guiding principle in the ancient Church, it was never absolutized or viewed as having no alternatives." Alfeyev cites the conflict between two bishops, Basil of Caesarea and Anthimus of Tyana, as an example.

== Present situation ==
=== Eastern Orthodoxy ===
Canonical territories of autocephalous and autonomous Eastern Orthodox jurisdictions as of 2022.

Even before the 2018 Moscow–Constantinople schism, the issue of canonical territory had proven to be a significant point of dispute between the Moscow Patriarchate and the Ecumenical Patriarchate over Ukraine.

==== Russian Orthodox Church ====
The meaning of canonical territory in the context of the Russian Orthodox Church "is not self-evident, and no detailed explanation of it is given in any official document." The Russian Orthodox Church defines the geographic extent of its canonical territory as including all the territory within China, Japan, and the post-Soviet states excluding Armenia and Georgia. (Note: As of 2013 the Russian Orthodox Church statutes list its canonical territory as within the states of Azerbaijan, Belarus, China, Estonia, Japan, Kazakhstan, Kyrgyzstan, Latvia, Lithuania, Moldova, Russian Federation, Tajikistan, Turkmenistan, Ukraine, and Uzbekistan.) It statutes define its sphere of jurisdiction as including "also [Eastern] Orthodox Christians living in other countries" outside of its canonical territory. (Note: As of 2015 the Russian language typical edition includes the phrase voluntarily joining ("на добровольно входящих в") which the English edition phrase, "also Orthodox Christians living in other countries," does not include.) The geographic extent of the canonical territory defined by the Russian Orthodox Church is disputed by other Eastern Orthodox Churches.

==== Phyletism ====
In diaspora countries such as France and the United States, problems with canonical territory have often given rise to the problem of phyletism, which is defined as the principle of nationalities applied in the ecclesiastical domain and the confusion between Church and nation.

=== Catholic Church ===
==== Eastern Catholic Churches ====
Canonical territories are mentioned numerous times in the Code of Canons of the Eastern Churches. (Note: Examples of CCEO canons that speak of the canonical territory of a sui iris church include 57, 78, 86, 102, 132, 133, 138-140, 143, 146-150.)

In the Eastern Catholic Churches that have the rank of patriarchate, the patriarchal synod elects bishops for the patriarchate's canonical territory. Bishops who head eparchies situated outside that territory are appointed by the Pope.
