= Eremia Grigorescu =

Romanian general and politician (1863–1919)

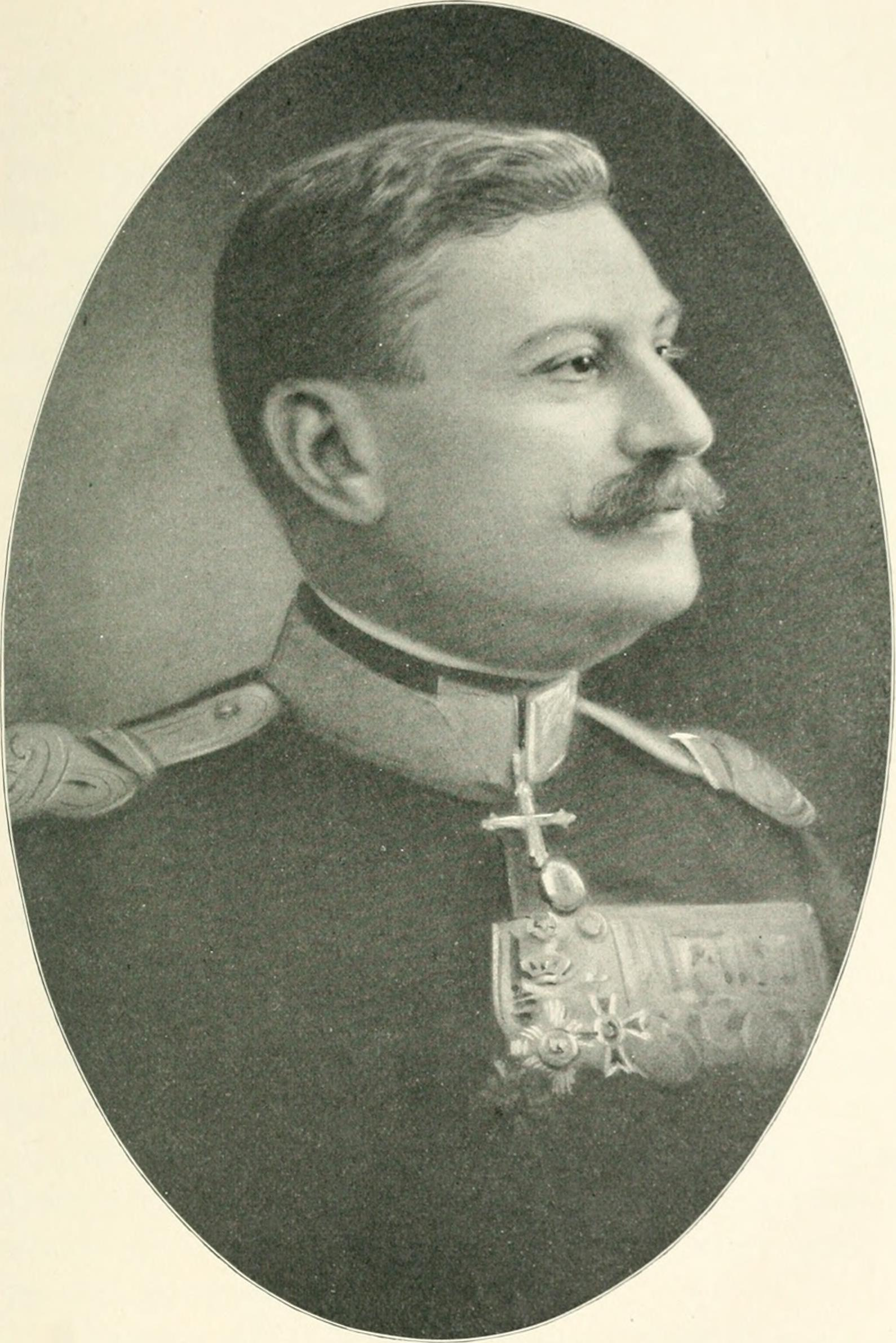
- Born: 28 November 1863; Golășei, near Târgu Bujor, Romanian United Principalities
- Died: 21 July 1919 (aged 55); Bucharest, Kingdom of Romania
- Burial place: Mausoleum of Mărășești
- Spouses: Eleonora Arapu (m. 1886; div. 1918) Elena Negropontes (m. 1918)
- Children: Traian, Romulus, Aurelian, Lucreția, Margareta, Dan Ulise
- Military career
- Allegiance: Kingdom of Romania
- Branch: Romanian Army
- Service years: 1882–1919
- Rank: General
- Commands: Romanian 1st Army
- Conflicts: First World War; Romanian Campaign; Battle of Mărășești
- Awards: Order of Michael the Brave, 2nd Class and 3rd Class Order of the Crown (Romania); Order of the Star of Romania; Grand Officer of the Légion d'honneur

Minister of War
- In office 24 October 1918 – 28 November 1918
- Prime Minister: Constantin Coandă
- Preceded by: Constantin Hârjeu
- Succeeded by: Artur Văitoianu

Minister of Industry and Commerce
- In office 24 October 1918 – 29 October 1918
- Prime Minister: Constantin Coandă
- Preceded by: Grigore G. Cantacuzino
- Succeeded by: Alexandru Cottescu

Eremia Teofil Grigorescu (28 November 1863 – 21 July 1919) was a Romanian general who served as the commander of the 1st Romanian Army during the First World War. He also served as Minister of War in the Constantin Coandă cabinet.

== Early life and military career ==
Born in 1863 in the village Golășei (Bujor Sat), actually part of Târgu Bujor, in Covurlui County, now Galați County, in the family of the teacher Grigore Grigorescu and Maria (née Cazacu) Grigorescu; he was the youngest child of the family, after Dumitru, Constantin and Sevastia. He attended primary school in Galați (1870–1874), in the class of teacher Rășcanu, "a well-known figure in the cultural world of Galați", secondary school at Vasile Alecsandri High School in Galați (1874–1878), and then the Academia Mihăileană in Iași (1878–1881). After graduation, he attended for a year the Faculty of Medicine of the University of Iași, before transferring to the Officers' School, Artillery section (1882–1884), later attending the School of Applications of Artillery and Engineering (1884–1886), both in Bucharest. In 1887 he was sent as a military attache to the French Artillery Committee "St. Thomas d'Aquin" in Paris (the name of the French Artillery Training Center at that time); here, in addition to his military duties, he studied mathematics for two years at Sorbonne (1877–1878).

While studying in Iași in 1881, he met Eleonora Arapu, a Mathematics student who later became the first female graduate of the University of Iași, and pursued a teaching career. The two married on 15 November 1886, and had five children: Traian (1887–1969, who continued in his footsteps and became a general), Romulus, Aurelian, Lucreția, and Margareta. While stationed in Oituz during the war, he met Elena Negropontes, whom he married in 1918 after divorcing his first wife; their son, Dan Ulise Grigorescu (1917–1990), became a noted artist and photographer.

The activity carried out in the service of the army was complemented by the activity of a military writer, consisting of memos on various technical matters, reports and miscellaneous memos, as well as two original works: the first - "Calculation of probabilities with application to artillery fire"; conceived in Paris while he was studying mathematics at the Sorbonne and published as soon as he returned to Romania, it was a first, because it was the first time that a Romanian officer addressed a very important problem for artillery; subsequently, the work was submitted to the investigation and approval of the artillery committee and imposed for consultation by all officers and corps; the second - "Ballistic study of the Mannlicher rifle, model 1893", written when he was the Director of the Army Gunpowder Warehouse in Dudești, became a useful tool for infantry and cavalry officers through the useful notions of ballistics and the data related to the characteristics of the respective weapon.

While he was director of the Army Gunpowder Warehouse, he repeatedly refused to accept an order for guncotton (a type of explosive), purchased from the Viennese company "Blumau", because it did not correspond to the specifications. For this reason, he was changed, by order of the Minister of War, Dimitrie Sturdza, from the position of director of the warehouse.

In 1903 he was appointed director of the Artillery section at the War Ministry, and from 1907 to 1910 commander of the Artillery Officer School.

== World War I ==
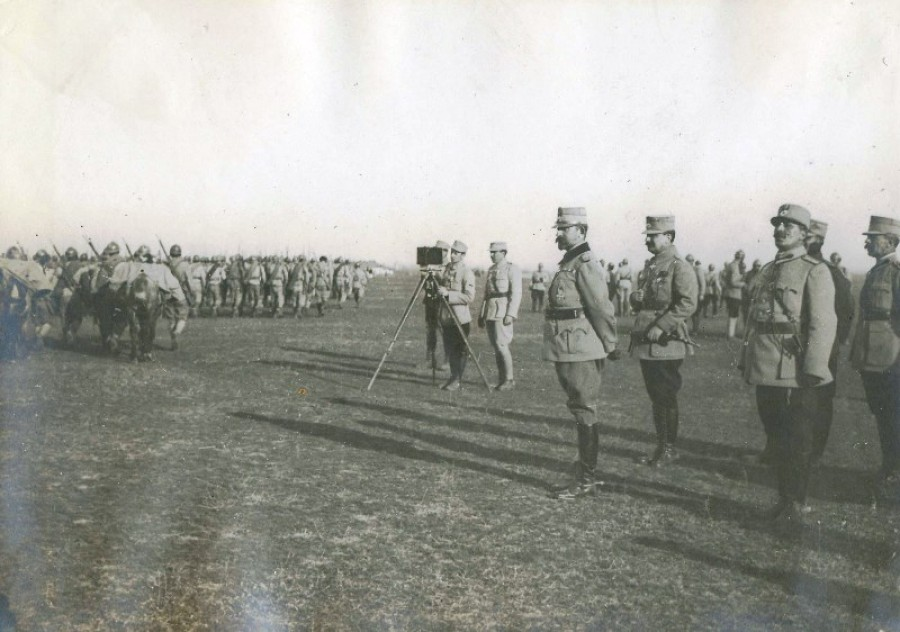
King Ferdinand I and General Grigorescu reviewing volunteer troops from Transylvania in summer 1917

When Romania entered the war (27 August 1916), brigadier general Grigorescu was in command of the 15th Infantry Division, in Dobrogea. The unit received the baptism of fire at Tutucaia where it suffered heavy losses; later in Dobrogea, this great unit stood out in the battles fought in the Arabagi-Mulciova area, restoring for 30 days the front that seemed to have been overtaken. Archive documents (diary of combat actions, orders given, plans drawn up, etc.) prove by their content, the clarity of the commander's vision of the situation and the fair way in which he made decisions. For fulfilling the mission in Dobrogea, he was the first general decorated with the Order of Michael the Brave 3rd class.

On October 1/14, 1916, the 15th Infantry Division was relocated to the mountainous front of the Northern Army, under which it was assigned. Here was the meeting with General Constantin Prezan, commander of the Northern Army, on which occasion, after receiving the mission, the commander of the 15th Infantry Division bluntly stated: "I know the situation, general. The enemy will not pass through here!" General Grigorescu's natural remark "Pe aici nu se trece!" ("You cannot pass through here!" or "No way on this way!") it became the motto of the entire group of forces that successfully defended the Oituz Valley, and the great unit earned its nickname of the "Iron Division."

Next year, during the Romanian Campaign of 1917 of World War I, Grigorescu was the commander of the Romanian 6th Army Corps at the outbreak of the Battle of Mărășești. On July 29–30/August 11–12, 1916, he accepted the decision of the head of the Grand Headquarters, General Constantin Prezan, and assumed command of the 1st Romanian Army, taking over from General Constantin Cristescu. In this position, General Eremia Grigorescu distinguished himself by refusing to execute a retreat that could be catastrophic, ordered by the Russian commander of the allied armies in Mărășești - General Alexander Ragoza.

The offensive of the German army in the battle of Mărășești began in the morning of July 24/August 6, with a violent artillery bombardment. After 14 days of heavy fighting, the Romanian First Army, initially in cooperation with several divisions of the Russian Fourth Army, rejected the strong offensive of the German army. The battle, by its duration, proportions and intensity, was the largest on the Romanian front throughout the war. The Romanian First Army led by General Constantin Cristescu (until July 30/August 12), and then by General Eremia Grigorescu, carried out one of the most brilliant successes of the war of national integration.

It was there that he achieved his greatest success, managing to defeat Imperial German troops led by General August von Mackensen. After the battle, Grigorescu was nicknamed the "hero of Mărășești". His victory was praised in Entente countries, and earned the general a sword sent to him by Yoshihito, the Emperor of Japan, bearing the inscription "You are the ones who write the history of the Country". He was also a recipient of the Order of Michael the Brave (the highest military decoration of Romania), 3rd Class in October 1916, and 2nd Class in February 1918, as well as the French Legion of Honour, Grand Officer Class.

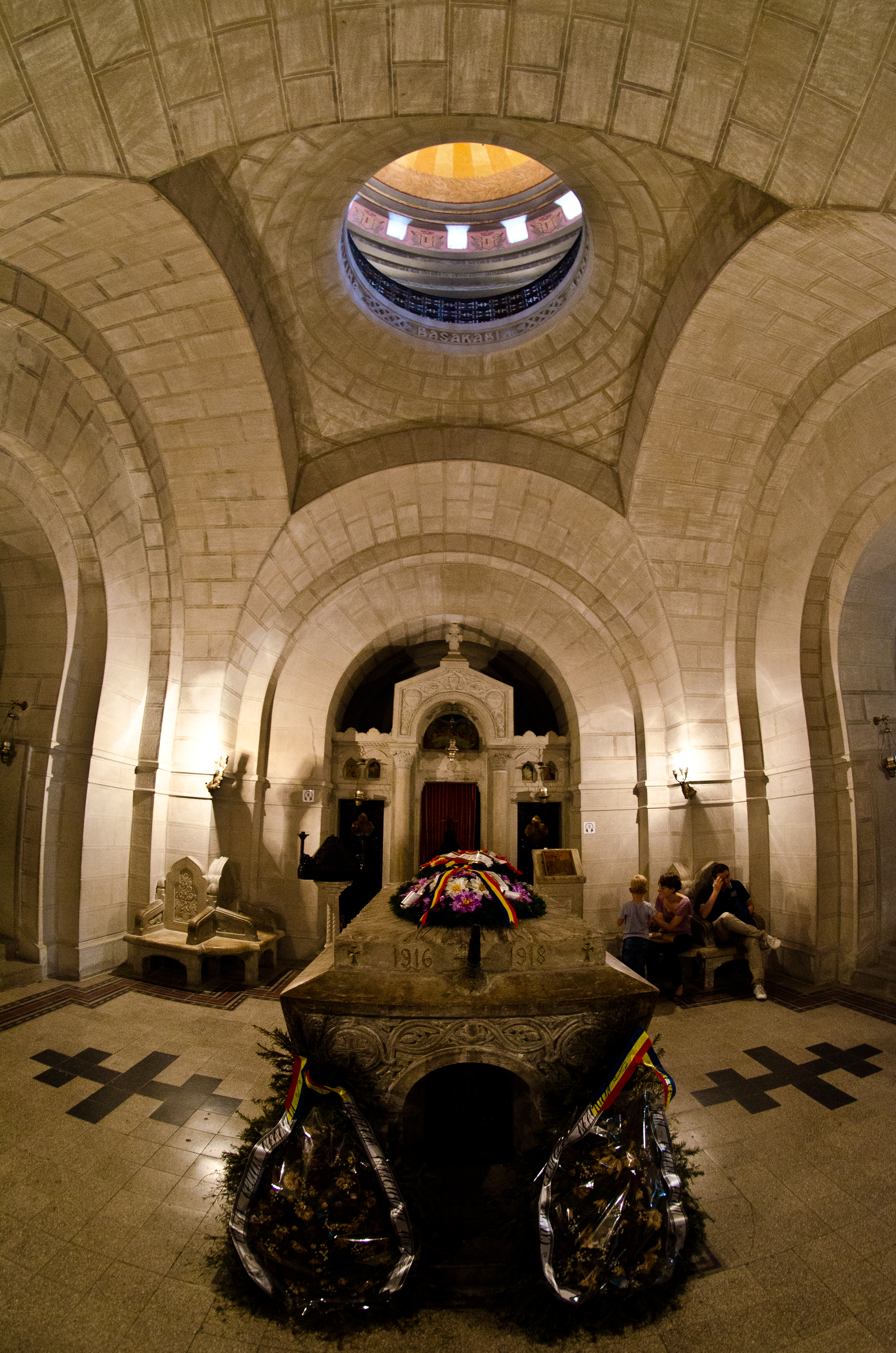
Grigorescu's tomb at the Mausoleum of Mărășești

Grigorescu died in Bucharest in July 1919 of the Spanish flu. He was initially buried at the Mărășești military cemetery; his remains were later moved, as he wished, among the soldiers with whom he fought, in the Mausoleum of Mărășești, built on the land donated by his father-in-law, the landowner George Ulise Negropontes. The inscription on his sarcophagus reads: "With the guards at the Gates of Moldavia, who put a stop to the enemy standing as rocks next to me, I wrote in blood on the ridges of Slănic, Oituz, and Cașin: "You cannot pass through here."

== Legacy ==
Highly trained military specialist, worthily, courageous military commander, with pragmatic and modern vision in tactical and strategic operations in real war conditions, considered a symbol of Romanian national dignity, General Eremia Grigorescu acquired the honorary title of "Hero of Marăşeşti". The general's face was immortalized in marble both in Timisoara and in his birthplace - the city of Târgu Bujor. A district of Cluj-Napoca is named after him, and so was the village of Umbrărești-Deal, in Galați County, between 1933 and 1950. There are also General Eremia Grigorescu streets in Galați, Brăila, Bucharest, Cluj-Napoca, Ploiești Timișoara and many other cities and towns in Romania. He was the subject of laudatory articles regarding his military merits, in his country ("Neamul Românesc" - 1917, "Mișcarea" - 1917) and abroad ("The Times" and "L'Echo de Paris" - 1917), in the political memoirs of some great commanders of the era (Marshal Joseph Joffre, General John J. Pershing, Marshal von Hindenburg, General Curt von Morgen), and in the works of historians Nicolae Iorga, A. D. Xenopol, Constantin Kiriţescu etc.

== Brief presentation ==
=== Studies ===
- primary school in Galați (1870–1874);
- "Vasile Alecsandri" High School in Galați (1874–1878);
- Academia Mihăileană (currently the National College) in Iași (1878–1881);
- University of Iași - Faculty of Medicine and Faculty of Sciences (1881–1882);
- Officers' School in Bucharest, Artillery section (1882–1884) - second lieutenant of artillery;
- School of Applications of Artillery and Engineering in Bucharest (1884–1886);
- School of Applications of Artillery in Fontainbleu (1885–1887);
- Faculty of Mathematics at "Sorbonne" University in Paris (1887–1889);
- training course in artillery, as a military attache to the French Artillery Committee "St. Thomas d'Aquin" in Paris (1887–1889).

== Military activity ==
- subunit commander in the 2nd, 6th, 10th, 11th, 9th and 1st Artillery Regiments (1884, 1889–1896);
- published his first theoretical work "Calculation of probabilities with application to artillery fire" (1890);
- taught the higher algebra and artillery course at the School of Artillery, Engineering and Marine in Bucharest (1891–1894);
- he was assigned to "Malmaison" barracks in Bucharest (1891–1894);
- sub-director (1896–1899) and then director of the Army Gunpowder Warehouse in Dudeşti, removed from his position by order of the Prime Minister Dimitrie Sturdza for the intransigence shown in not accepting an order of guncotton purchased from the Viennese company "Blumau", whose characteristics did not correspond to the Task book (1899–1903);
- director of the Artillery Directorate within the Ministry of War (1905);
- commander of the 3rd Artillery Brigade (1906);
- director and professor of higher algebra of the School of Artillery, Engineering and Navy in Bucharest (1907–1910);
- director of personnel in the Ministry of War (1913);
- second lieutenant (1884), lieutenant (1889), captain (1892), major (1899), lieutenant colonel (1902)), colonel (1911), brigadier general (1915), major general (1917), army corps general (1918);
- commander of the 14th Infantry Division (1915);
- commander of the 15th Infantry Division ("Iron Division") (1915–1917), with which he won the battles of Mulciova and Arabagi (Dobrogea) and Oituz (11-27 Oct. 1916) when he launched the famous slogan "You can't pass this way" ("No way on this way!");
- commander of the 4th Army Corps (Jan. 4, 1917) and 6th Army (June 1917);
- commander of the Romanian 1st Army (July 30, 1917 – 1918) and the Russian 8th Corps, with the 14th, 15th, 103rd Divisions and the Zamurskaia Division of the Russian 4th Army (July 31, 1917), with which he won the battle of Mărășești, under the slogan "You can't pass here either!" ("No way on this way either!");
- inspector general of the Army (1918–1919);
- Minister of War in the Constantin Coandă government (24 Oct. – 28 Nov. 1918), ad-interim Minister for industry and commerce.

== Military writings ==
- Hotchkiss Revolving Cannon (1885–1886),
- Calculation of probabilities with application to artillery fire (1898),
- Ballistic study of the Mannlicher rifle, model 1893 (1902).

== Distinctions and decorations ==
- Order of the Crown of Romania with swords, in the rank of commander and grand officer;
- Order of the Star of Romania with swords, in the ranks of commander and grand officer;
- Order of Saint Anna with swords, in the rank of grand cross, commander and grand officer (Russia);
- Order of Michael the Brave 3rd class, for the way he led the actions of the 15th Division in the battles in Dobrogea (the first Romanian general to receive this distinction "for acts of bravery in the face of the enemy");
- Order of Michael the Brave 2nd class, "for the bravery and skill with which he managed to stop the German offensive at Mărăşeşti in the summer of 1917";
- Order of the Black Eagle (Prussia);
- Croix de guerre (France);
- National Order of the Legion of Honour in the rank of commander (France);
- Order of the Bath (Great Britain) in the rank of Knight Companion;
- Cross of Order of St. George (Russia);
- he was awarded a "sword of honor" (inscribed with the names of Oituz, Pralea, Mărăşeşti) by a committee made up of professors from the University of Iași, among whom were Petru Poni, A.D. Xenopol (Nov. 11, 1918);
- he was awarded a "sword of honor" from the Emperor of Japan, with the inscription "You are the ones who write the history of the country" (1918);
- Crossing of the Danube Cross, "The Honorary Sign for 25 years of military service" [ro], "Industrial and Commercial Merit" Medal [ro], "Manhood and Faith" Medal [ro], 1st class;
- mentioned in dispatches: Royal Order of the Day (31 December 1916) and Orders to the Northern Army by General Constantin Prezan (7 October 1916).

== Gallery ==
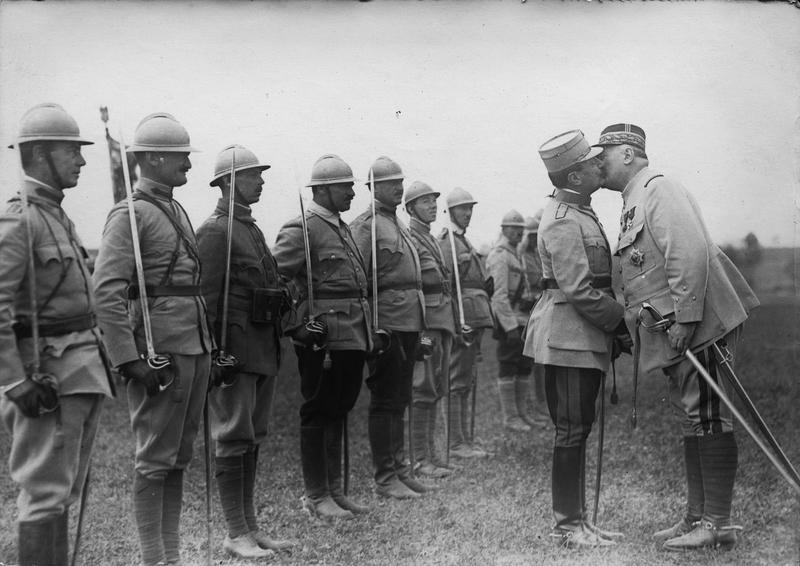
French General Henri Berthelot hands over the commander's tie to General Grigorescu (June 6, 1917)

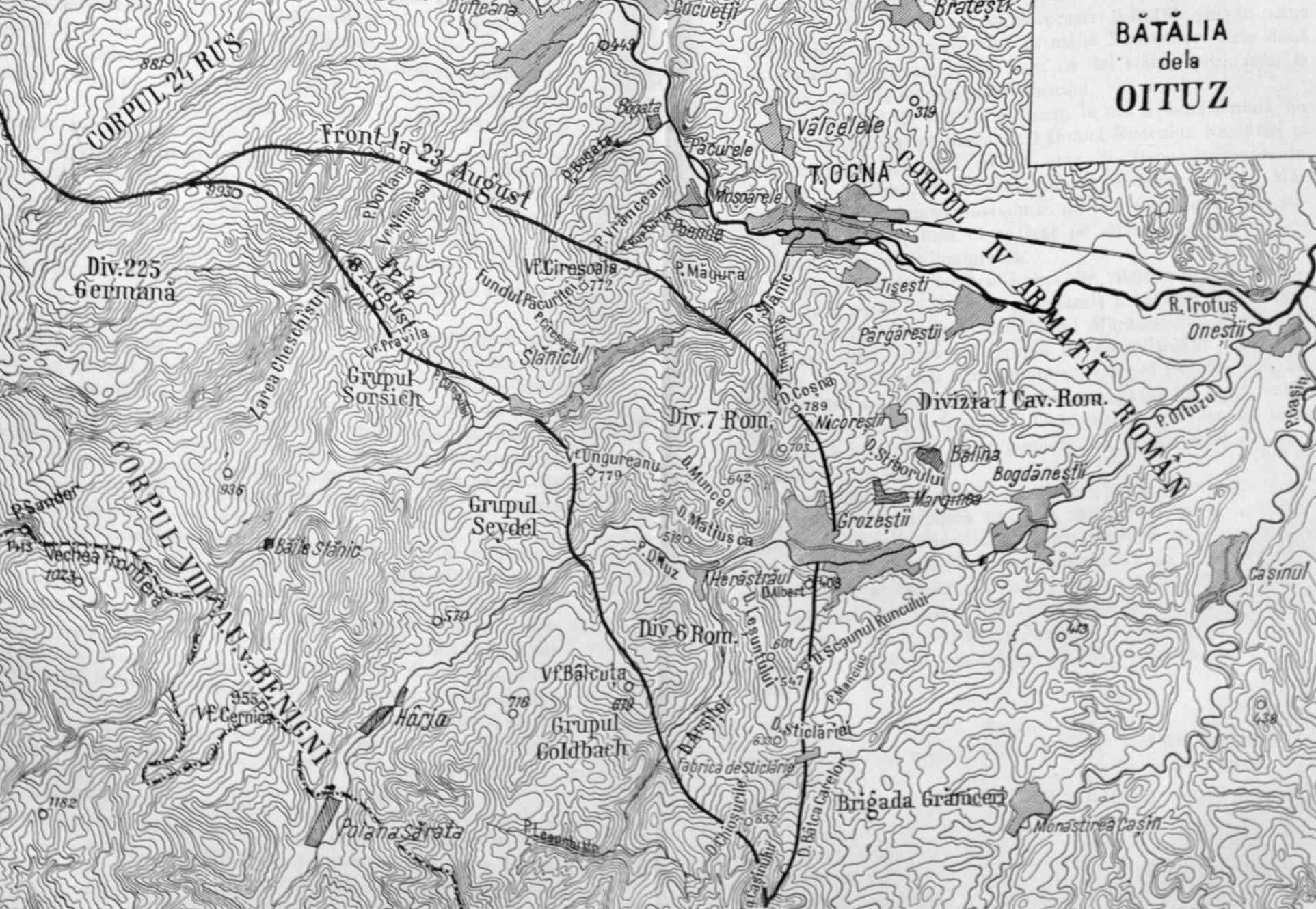
Map of the Battle of Oituz

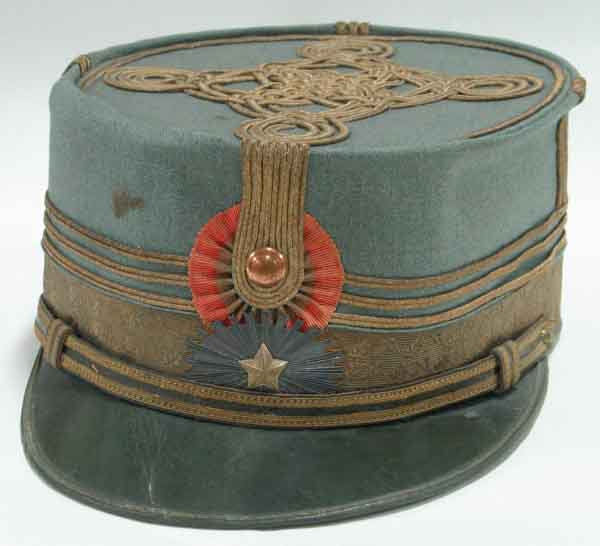
The cap of Army Corps General Eremia Grigorescu, commander of the Romanian First Army during the First World War.

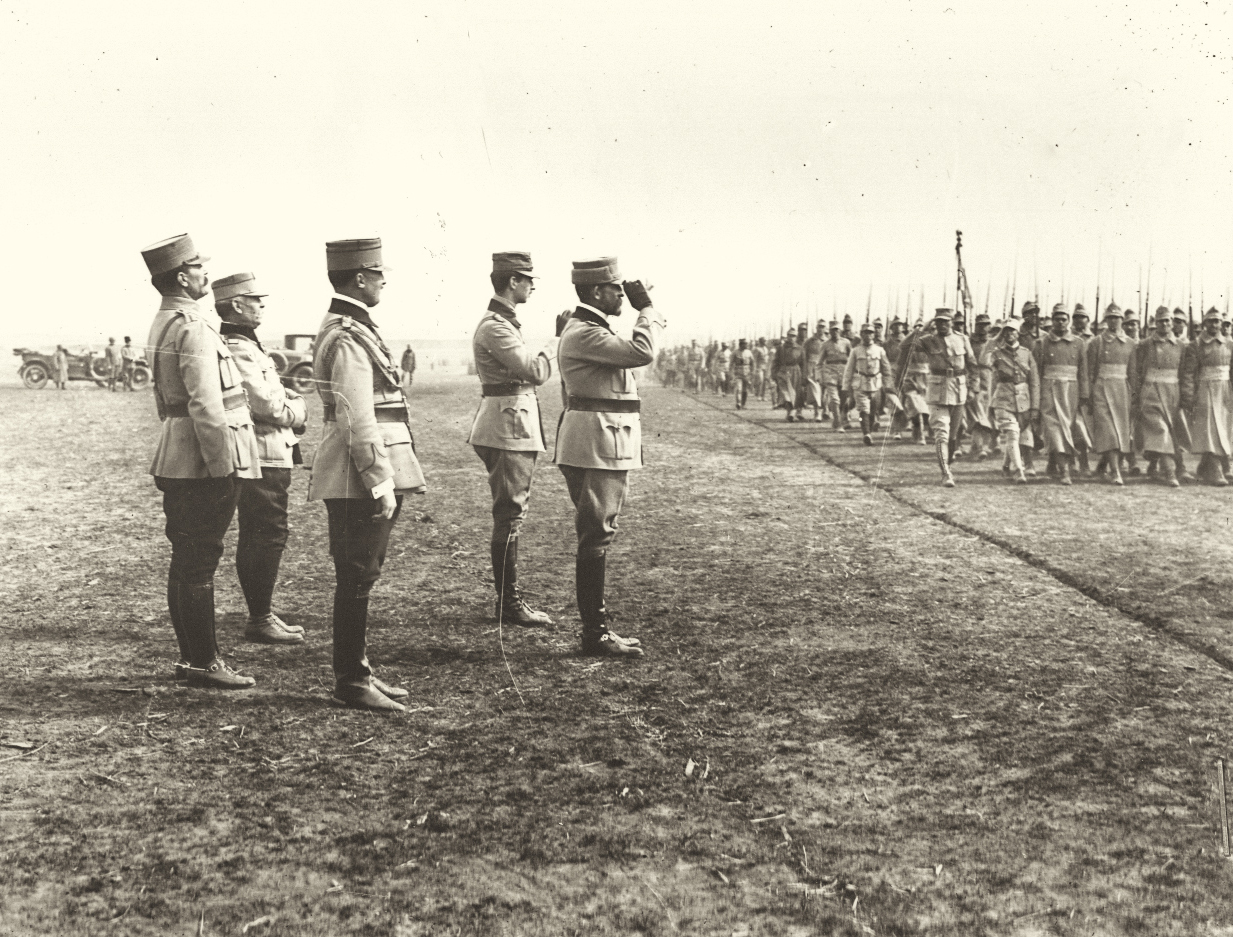
King Ferdinand with Prince Carol and General Eremia Grigorescu carrying out an inspection of the troops after taking the oath in the summer of 1917

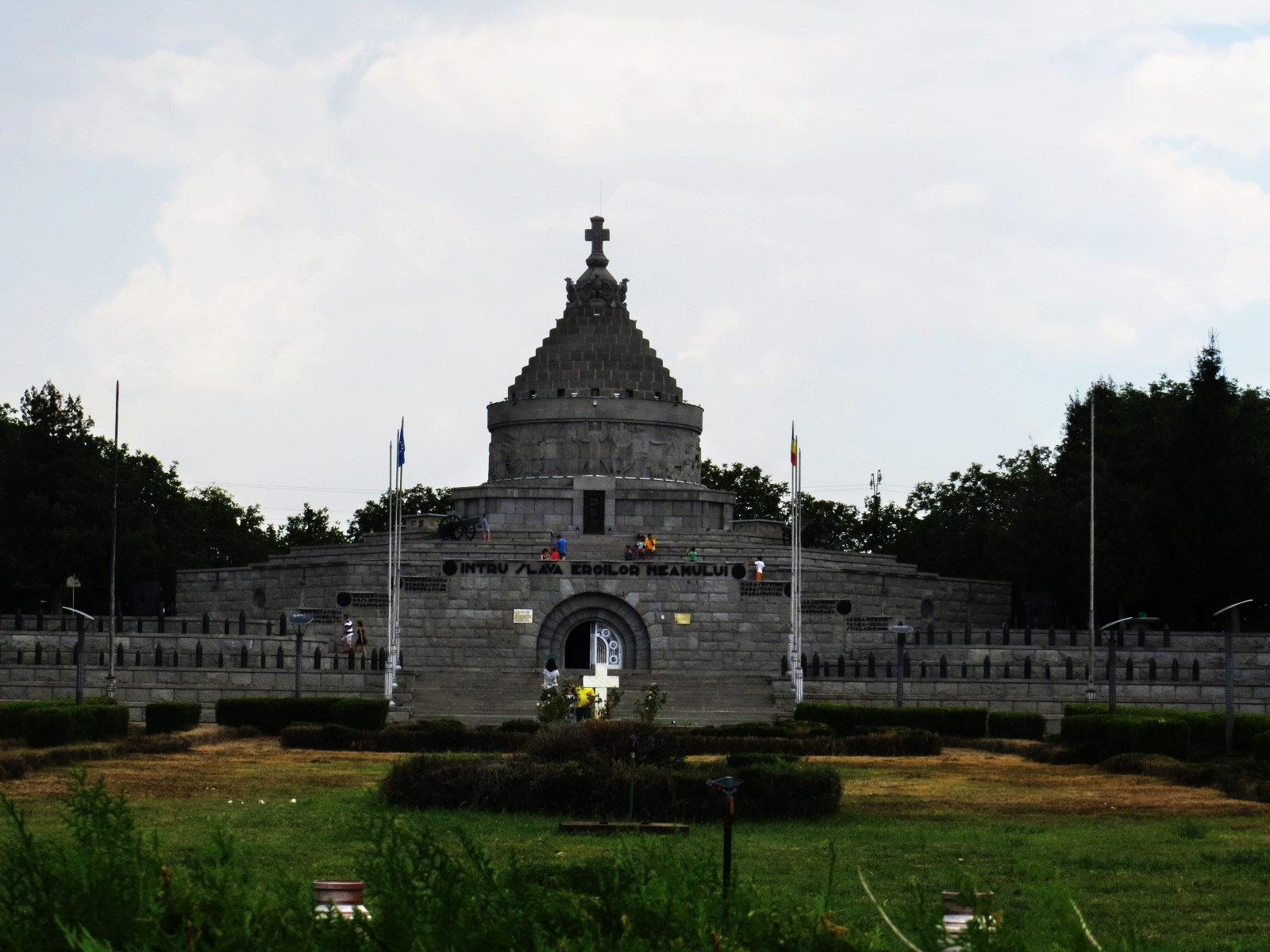
Mausoleum of Mărășești

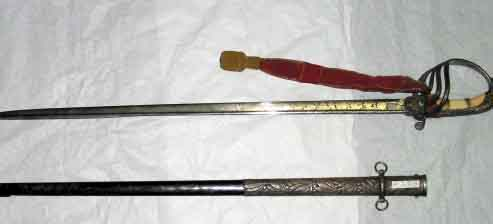
Sword of honor awarded to General Eremia Grigorescu by the professors at the University of Iași

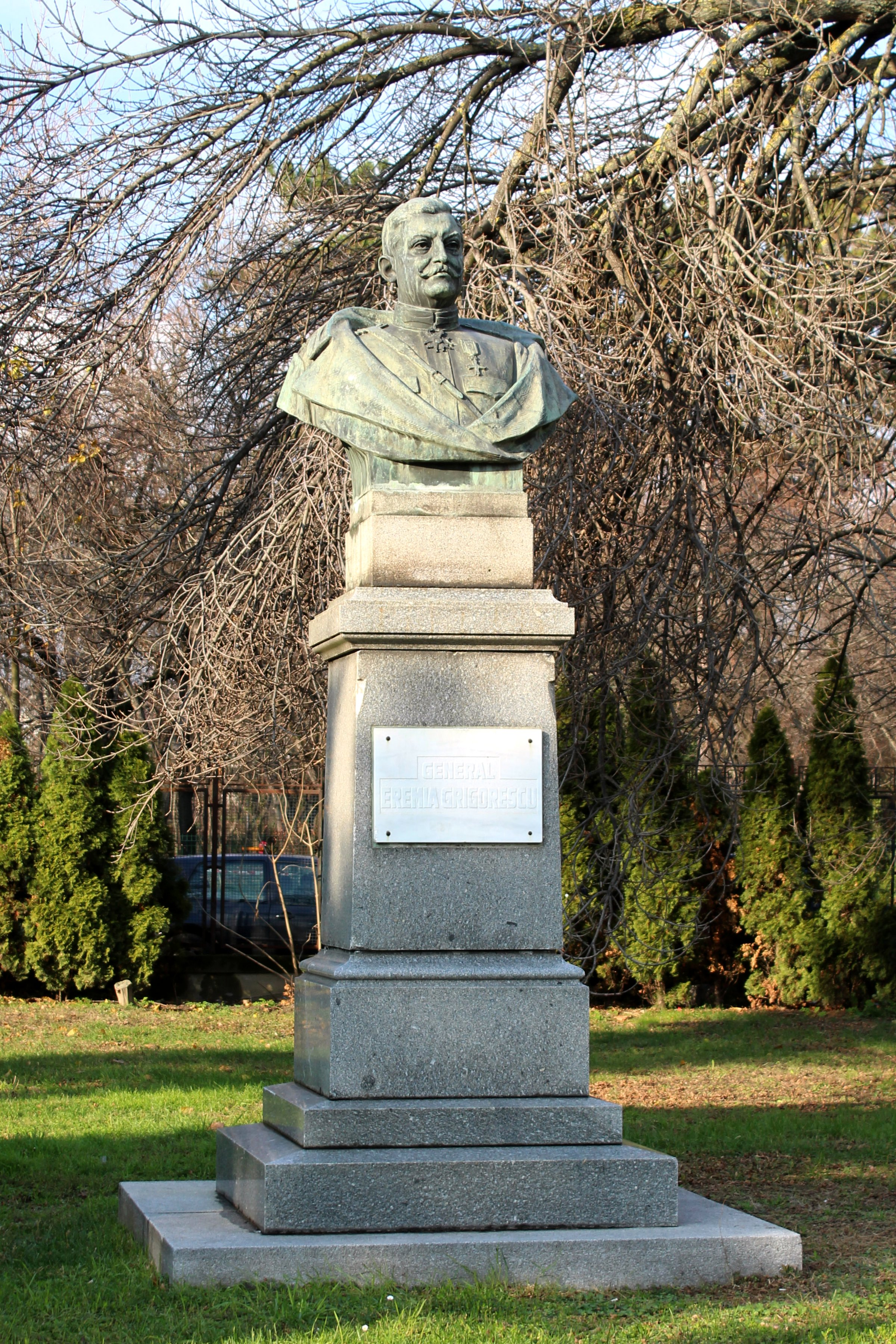
Bust of General Grigorescu in Timișoara, work of the sculptor Oscar Späthe [ro] (1928)
