= Maria Zaharia =

Maria Ion Zaharia
- Born: 1905; Pădureni, Kingdom of Romania
- Died: 6 August 1917 (age 11-12); Haret, Kingdom of Romania
- Burial place: Mausoleum of Mărășești
- Known for: acting as an artillery observer for the Romanian Army during the Battle of Mărășești, despite her age

Maria Ion Zaharia, also known as Măriuca Zaharia (1905 – 6 August 1917), was a Romanian girl who acted as an impromptu artillery observer for the Romanian Army and was killed during the Battle of Mărășești.

== Biography ==
Born in Pădureni in 1905, Maria lived in August 1917 with her grandfather Ion Zaharia in the village of Haret, close to the front. In the orchard of her grandfather the Romanian Army set up an artillery observation post up a walnut tree that offered a good view of the surrounding landscape. There Maria became acquainted with the Romanian soldiers and was captivated by their work.

On 5 August 1917, following a German bombardment, the observer in the Măriuca's orchard was killed and the little girl took his place and communicated via phone what she saw on the battlefield. "I want to do something for my country too", Maria said to the HQ commanders, puzzled that a child was doing the work of an artillery observer. And the information provided by Măriuca proved to be effective in stopping the German advance. The girl was eventually killed by a shell.

She is buried at the Mausoleum of Mărășești, the only child who is laid to rest there.

== Legacy ==
Her story was immortalized in the 1969 film "Baladă pentru Măriuca" and in the children's book "Povestiri istorice" (1982) by Dumitru Almaș.
