= Mausoleum of Mărășești =

Heritage site in Vrancea County, Romania

Coordinates: 45°52′19.927″N 27°12′28.746″E

- Romania
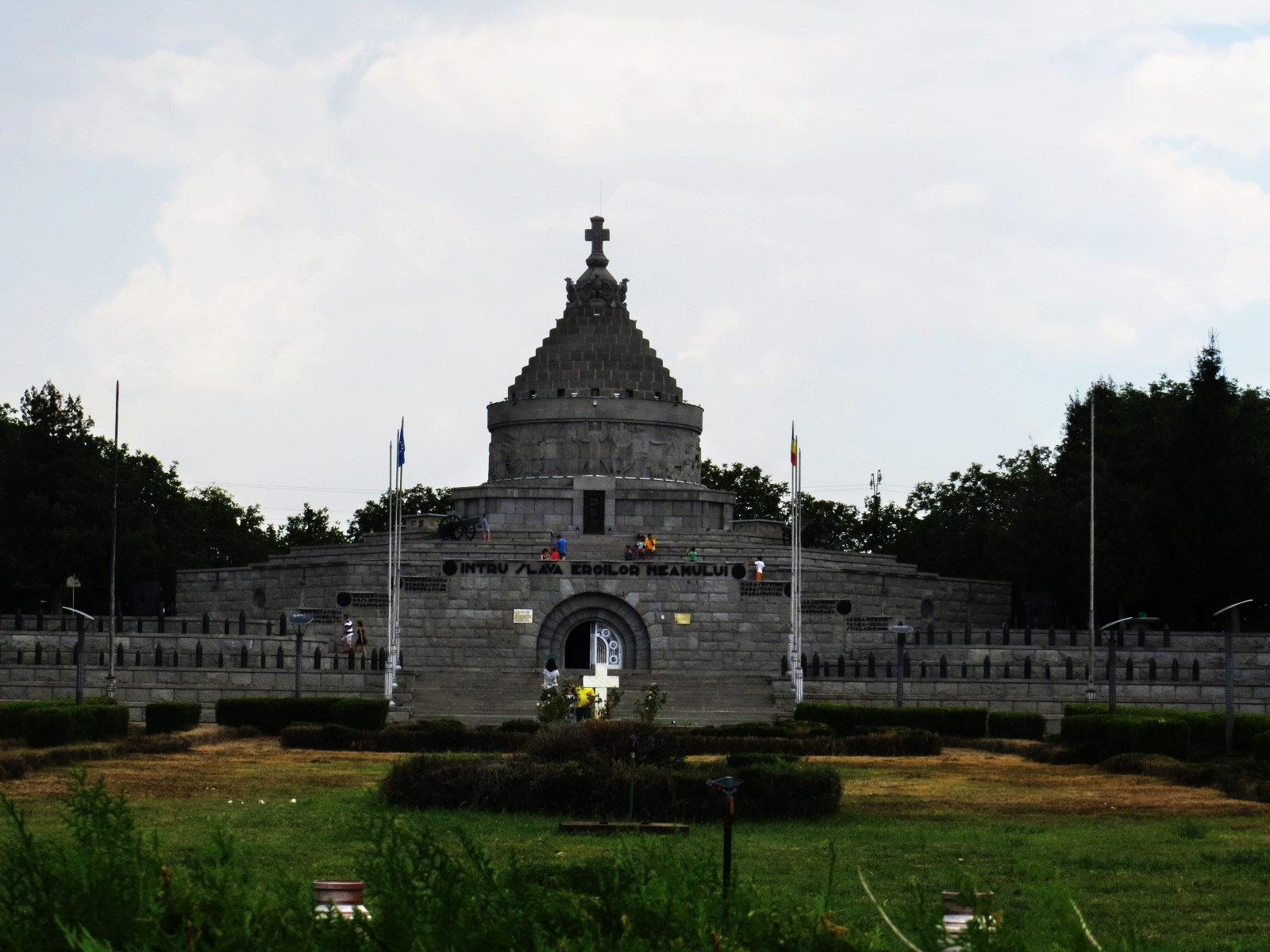
- The Mausoleum of Mărășești
- For First World War Romanian dead and First World War Romanian missing, presumed dead.
- Unveiled: 18 September 1938; By King Carol II
- Location: near Mărășești, Vrancea County, Romania
- Designed by: George Cristinel and Constantin Pomponiu

The Mausoleum of Mărășești is a memorial site in Romania containing remains of 5,073 Romanian soldiers and officers killed in the First World War and dedicated to the commemoration of the Battle of Mărășești and Romanian Army members who were killed during World War I.

The memorial took architects George Cristinel and Constantin Pomponiu 15 years to build and was unveiled on 18 September 1938 by King Carol II. The frieze in bas-relief surrounding the base of the dome was sculpted by Cornel Medrea and Ion Jalea.

It is featured on the circulating twenty lei banknote issued by National Bank of Romania.

== Background ==
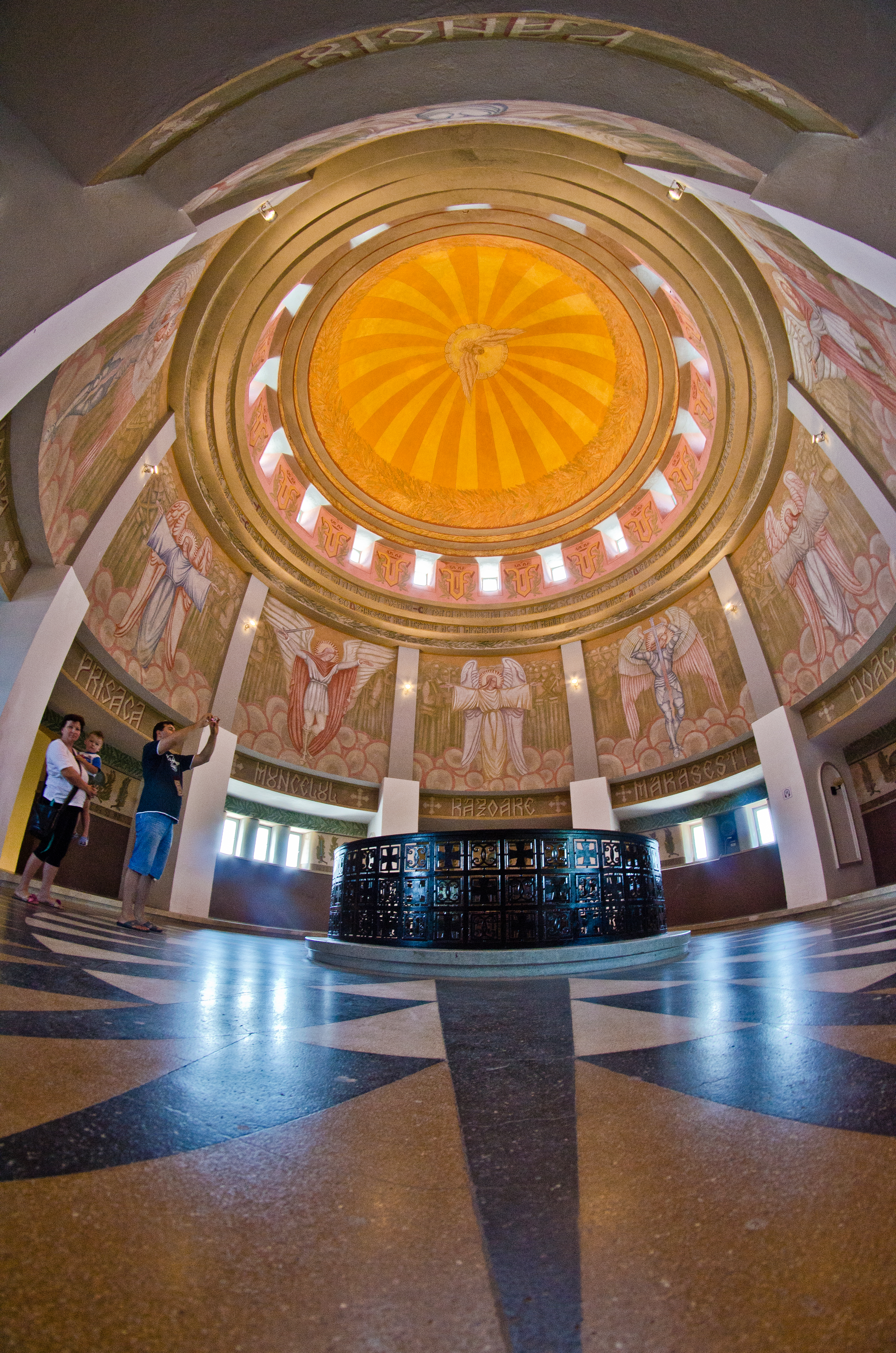
Interior of the mausoleum

The Battle of Mărășești (August 6 to September 8, 1917) was a battle fought during World War I between the German Empire and the Kingdom of Romania.

The two sides sent into battle a total of about 1 million soldiers. The Romanian battle plan called for attack on Nămoloasa, but developments elsewhere on the Eastern Front led to shelving that plan. Field Marshal August von Mackensen launched an attack on August 6. The fighting lasted until September 8, when both sides ran out of fresh units. The German attempt to crush the Romanian army led by General Eremia Grigorescu failed, but the Romanians did not regain any more of their territory either. The motto of the Romanian Army during the battle was "Pe aici nu se trece" (English: "They shall not pass").

Romania lost over 27,000 men, including 610 officers, while Germany lost over 47,000. Notably, the Romanian heroine Ecaterina Teodoroiu was killed at the end of this battle, on September 6, by machine-gun fire; two days later, Major General Karl von Wenninger was killed by artillery fire near the village of Muncelu, Străoane.

== Memorials at the Mausoleum ==
- Burials
  - Eremia Grigorescu (1863–1919)
  - Grigore Ignat (1889–1917)
  - Maria Zaharia (1905–1917)
- Cenotaphs
  - Henri Cihoski (1871–1950)

== Gallery ==
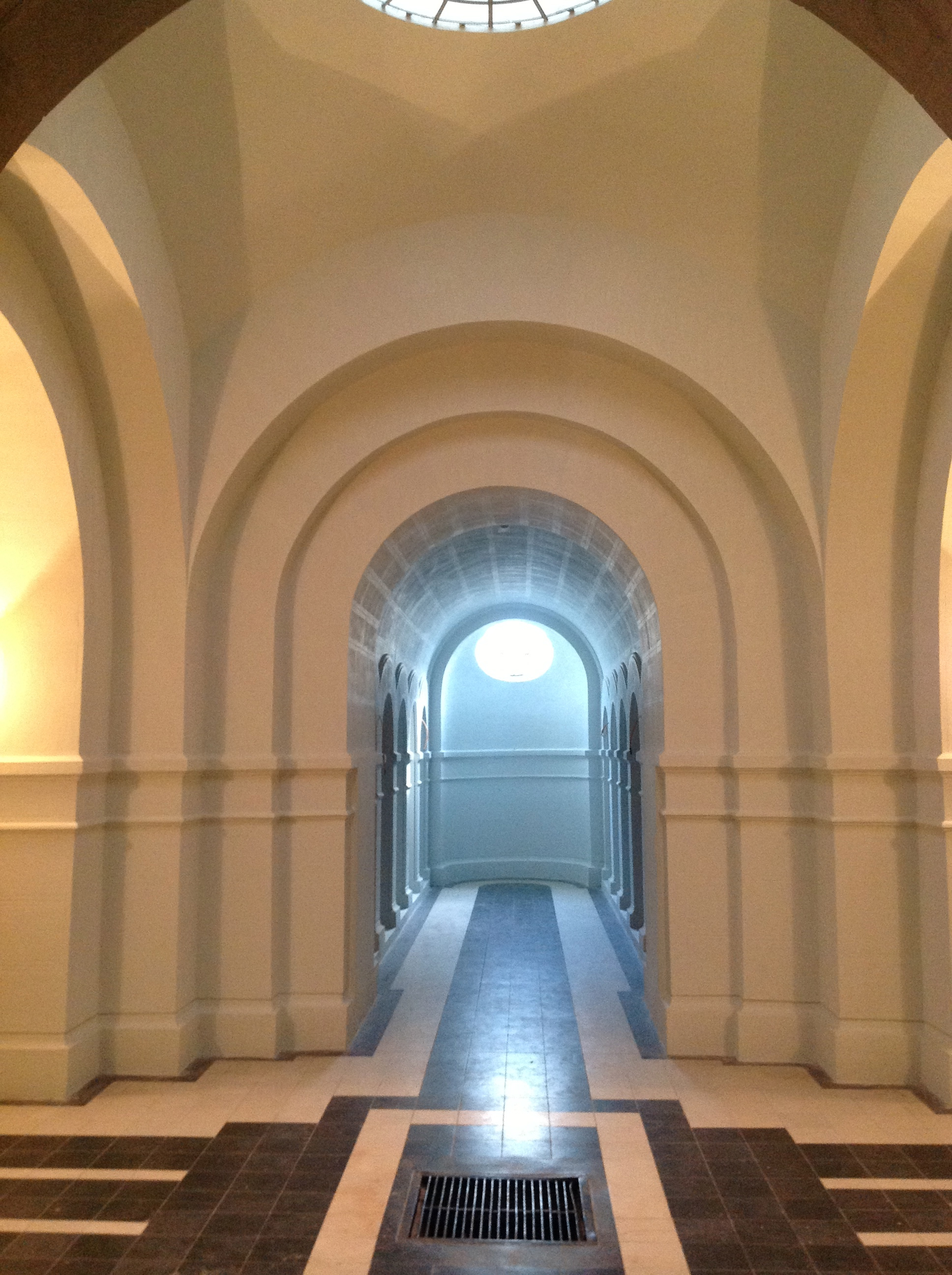

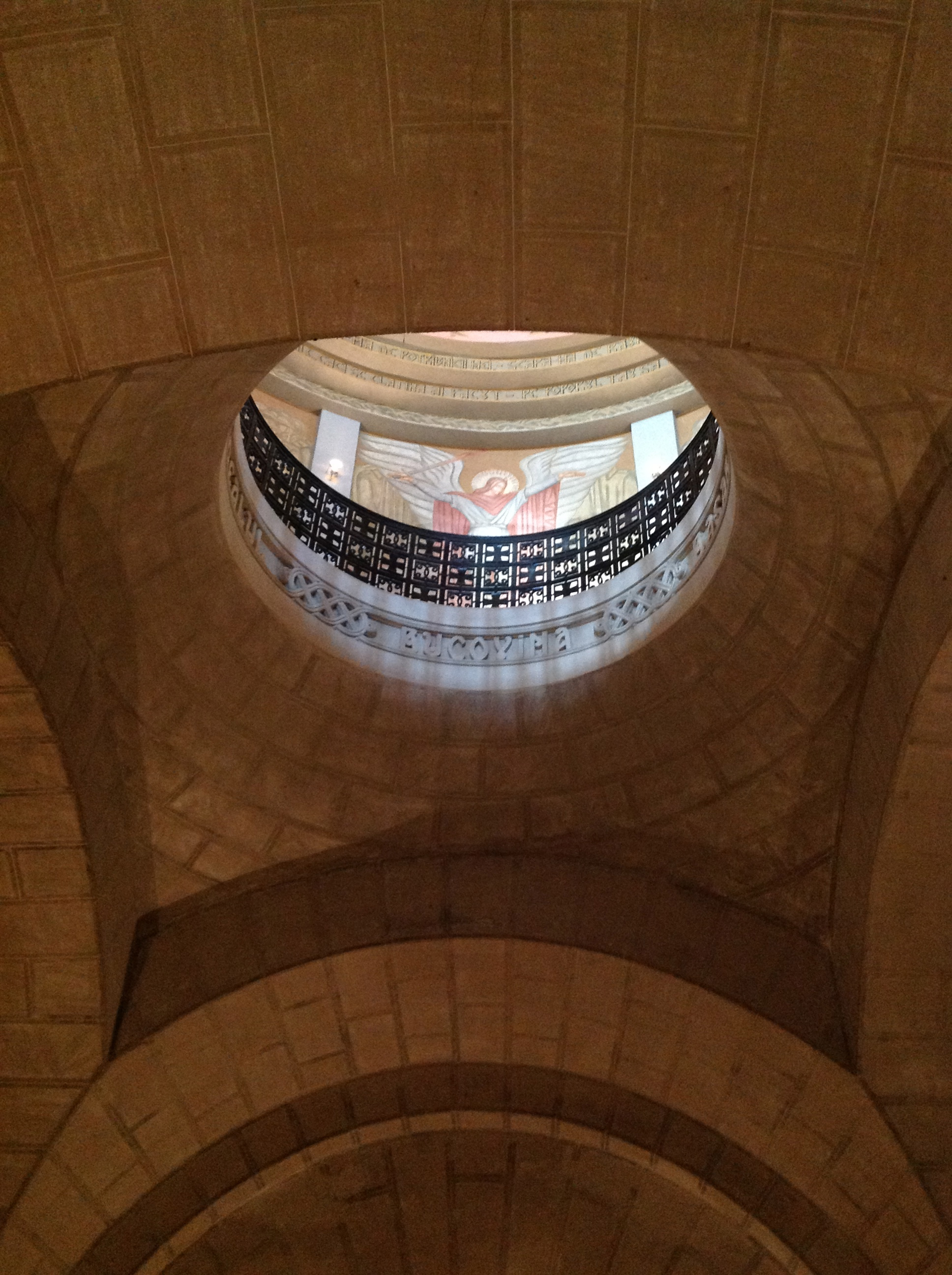

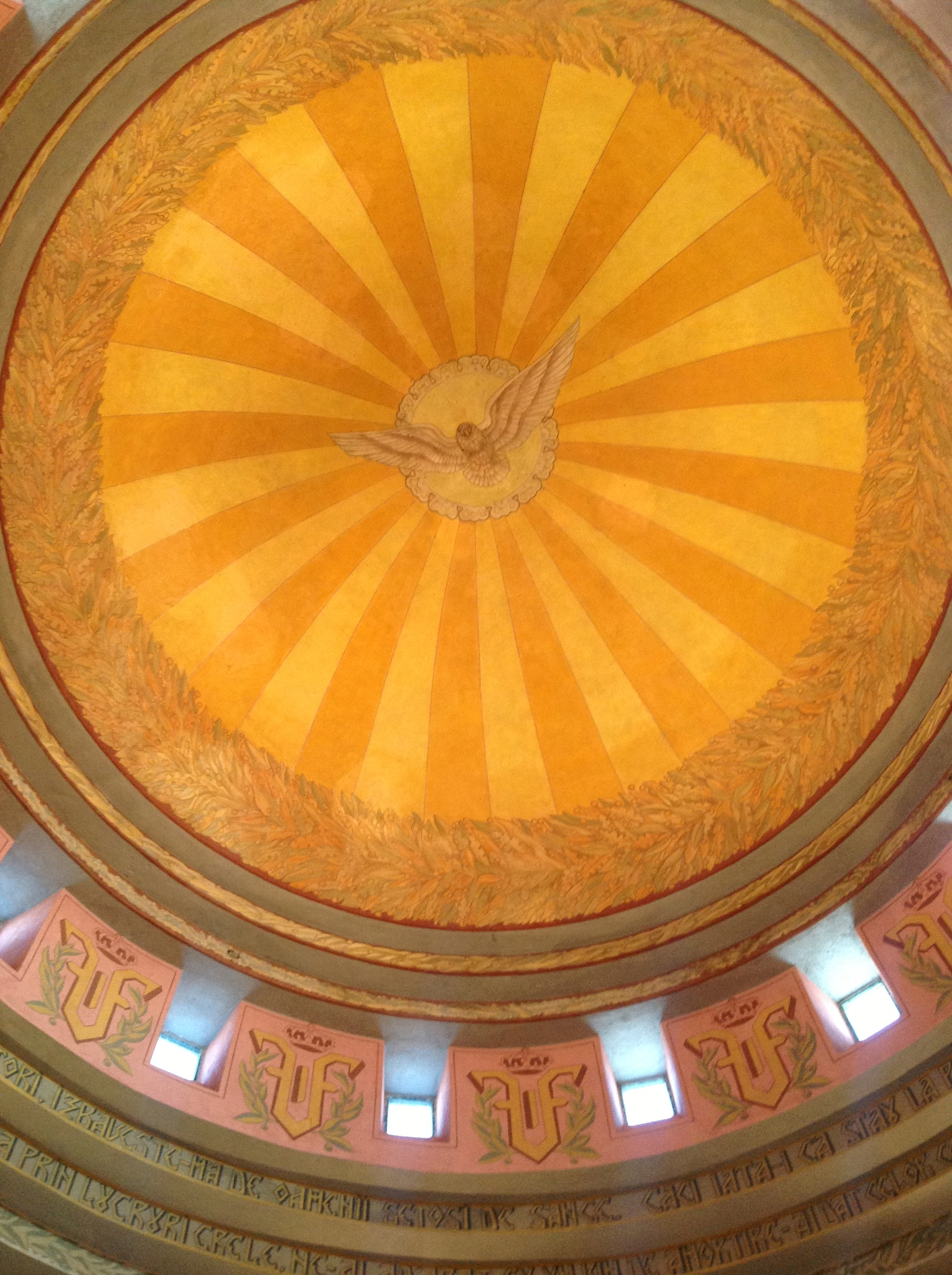

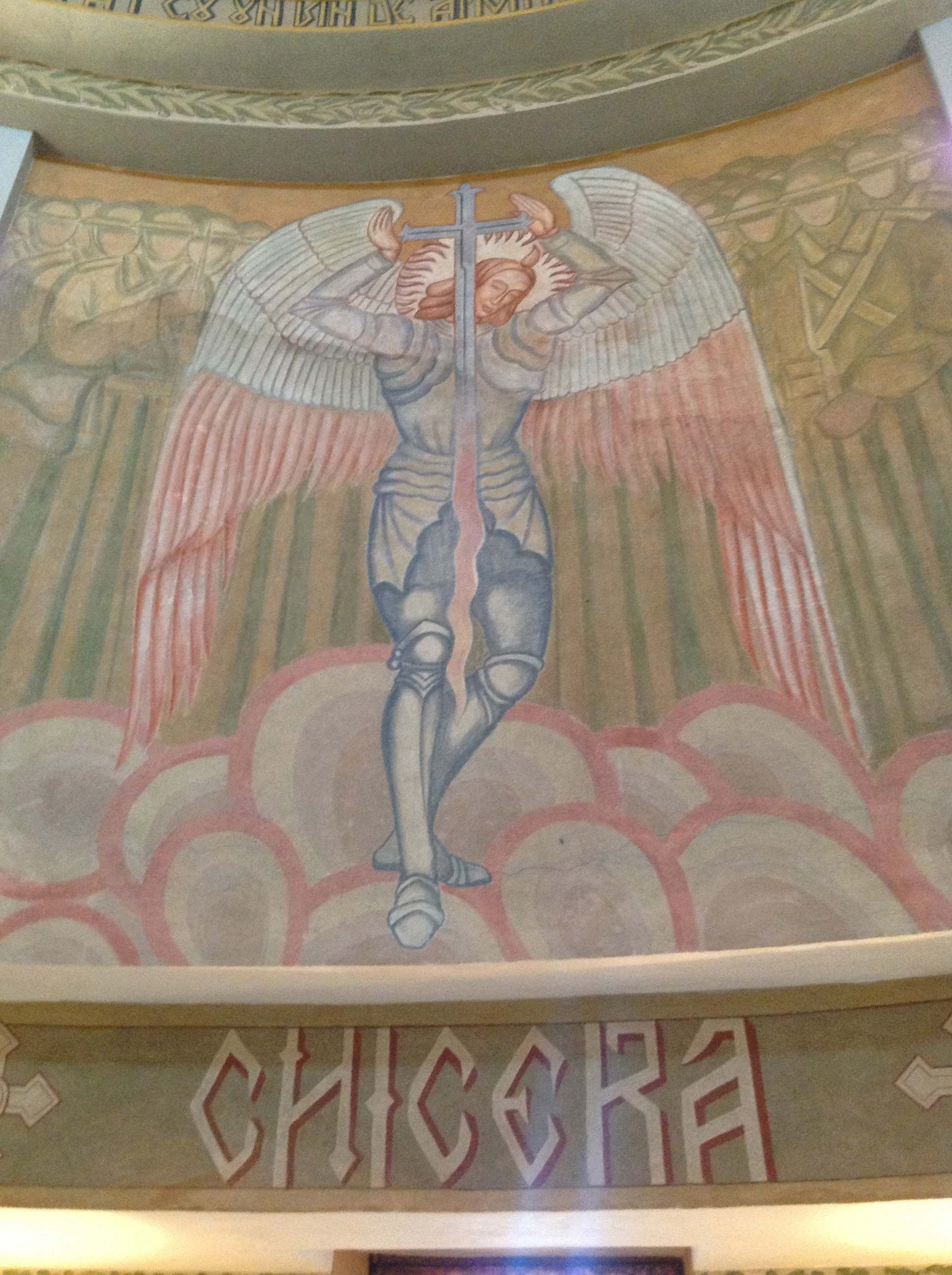

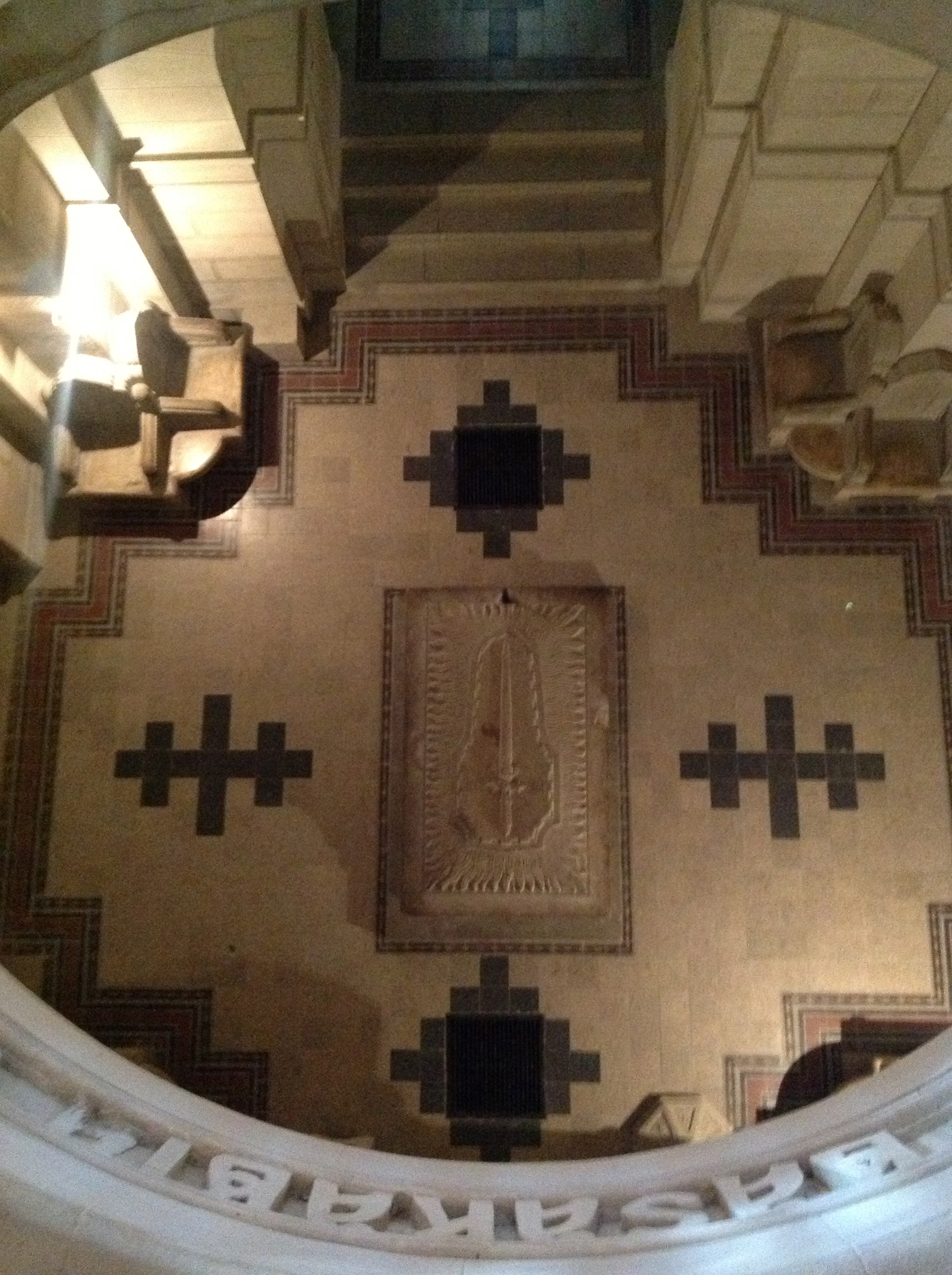

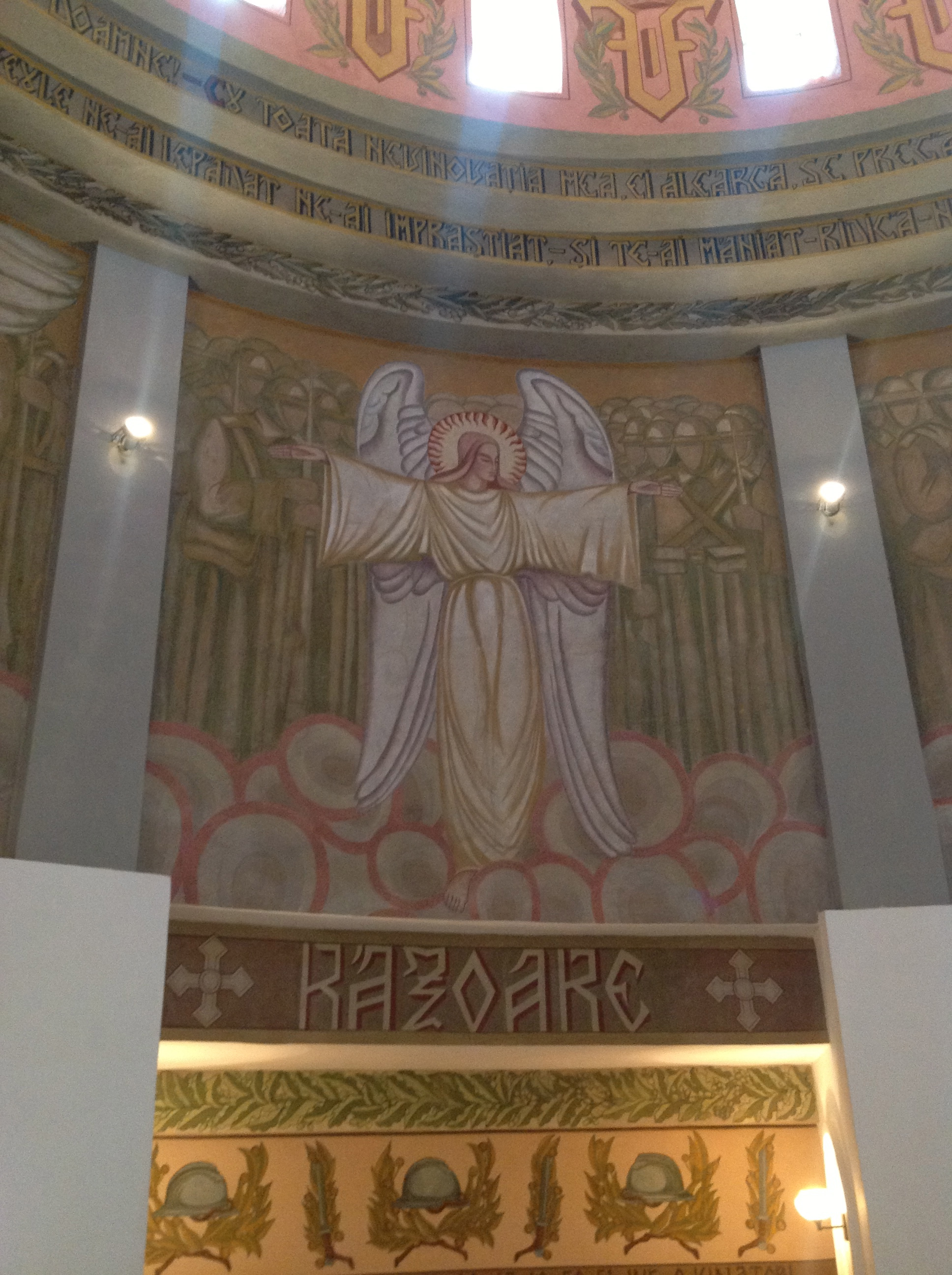

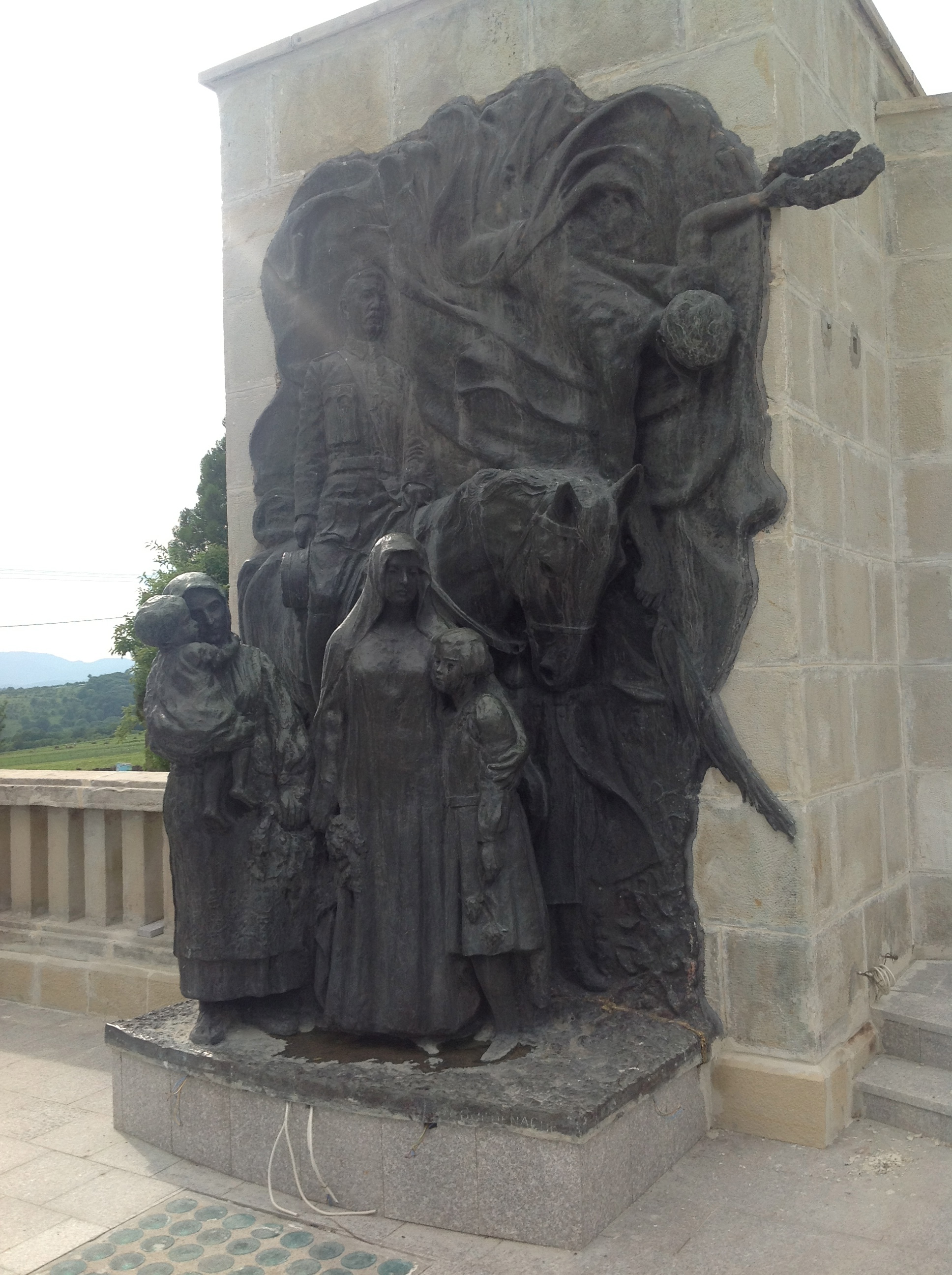

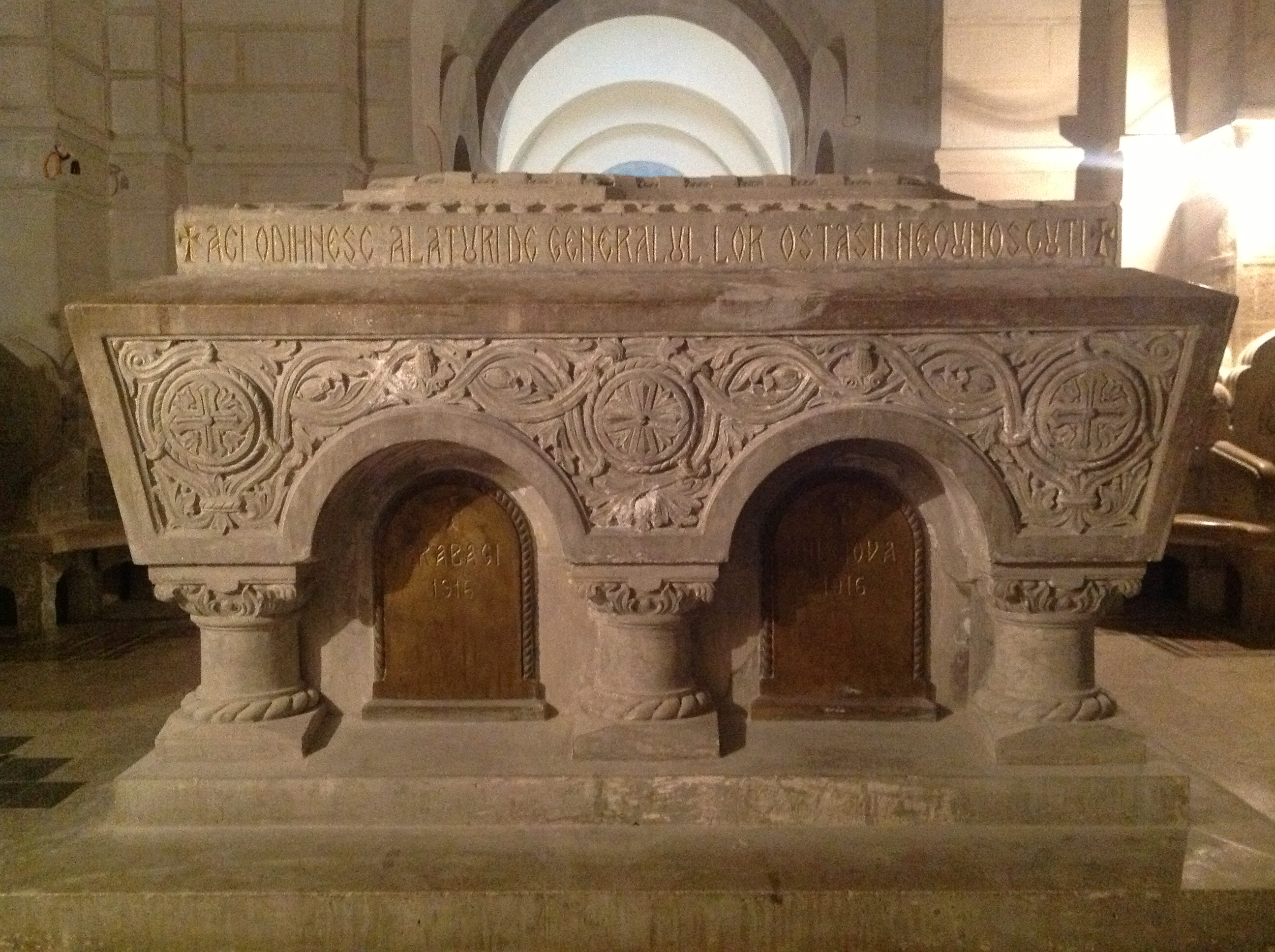

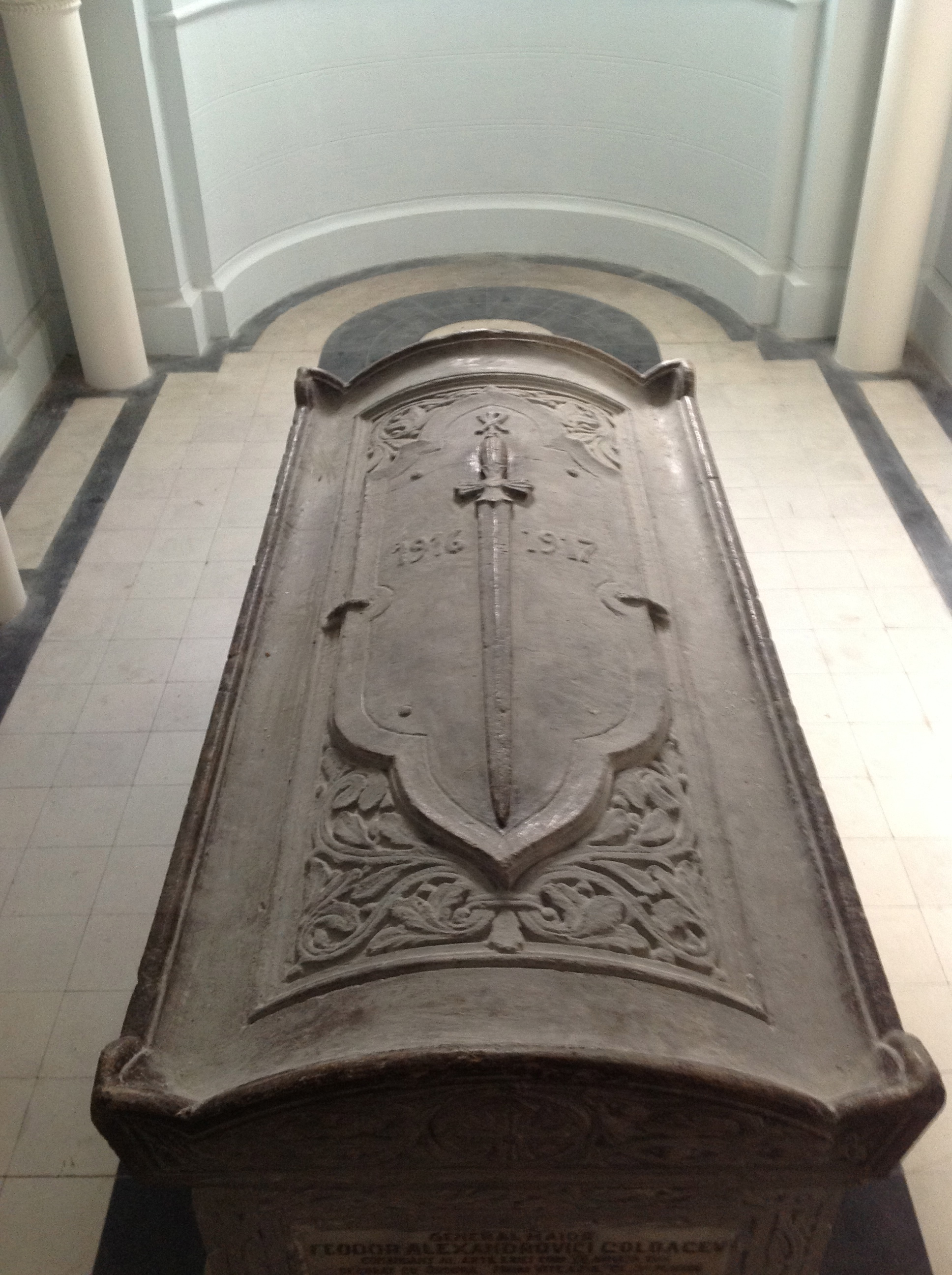

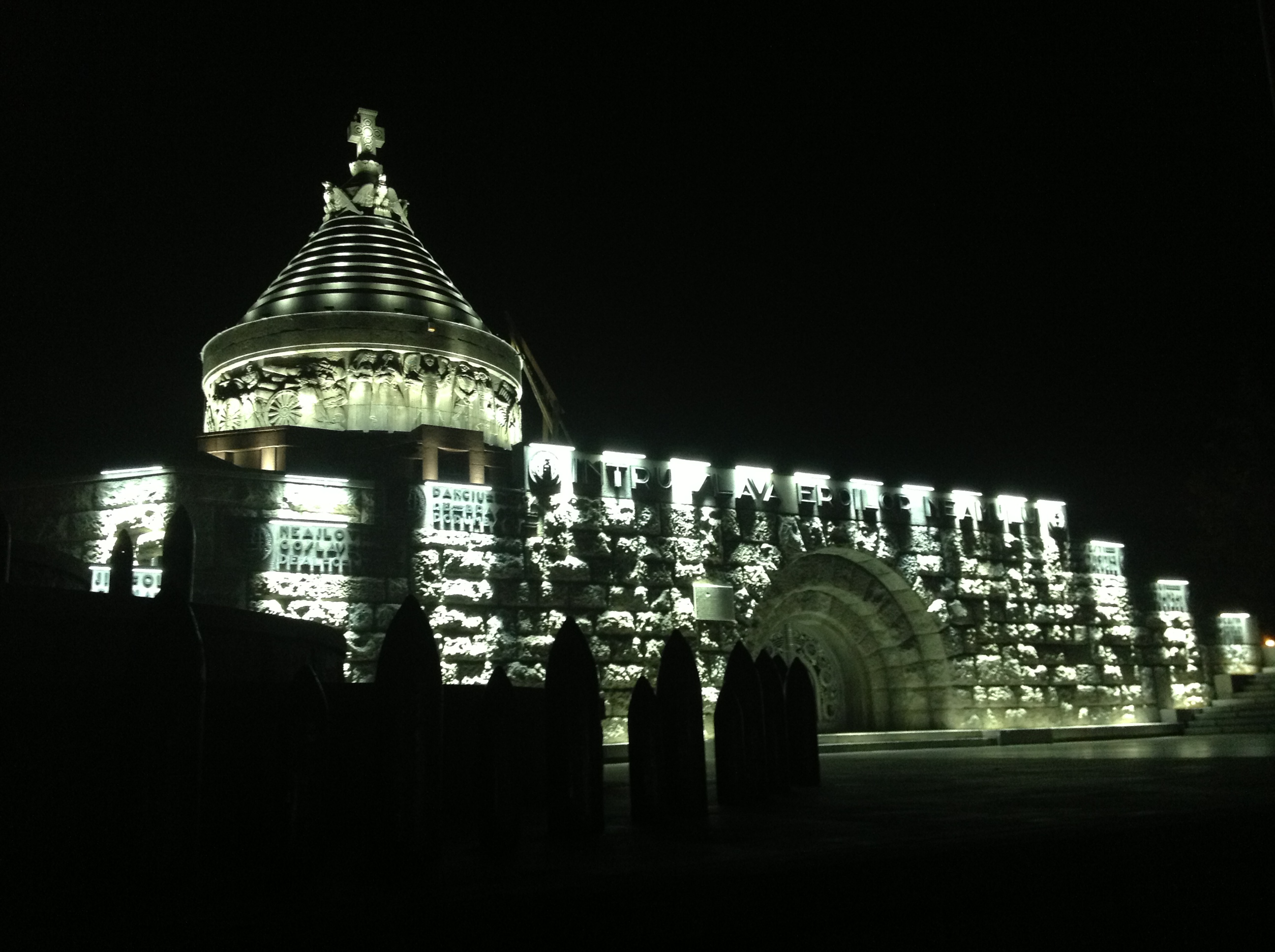

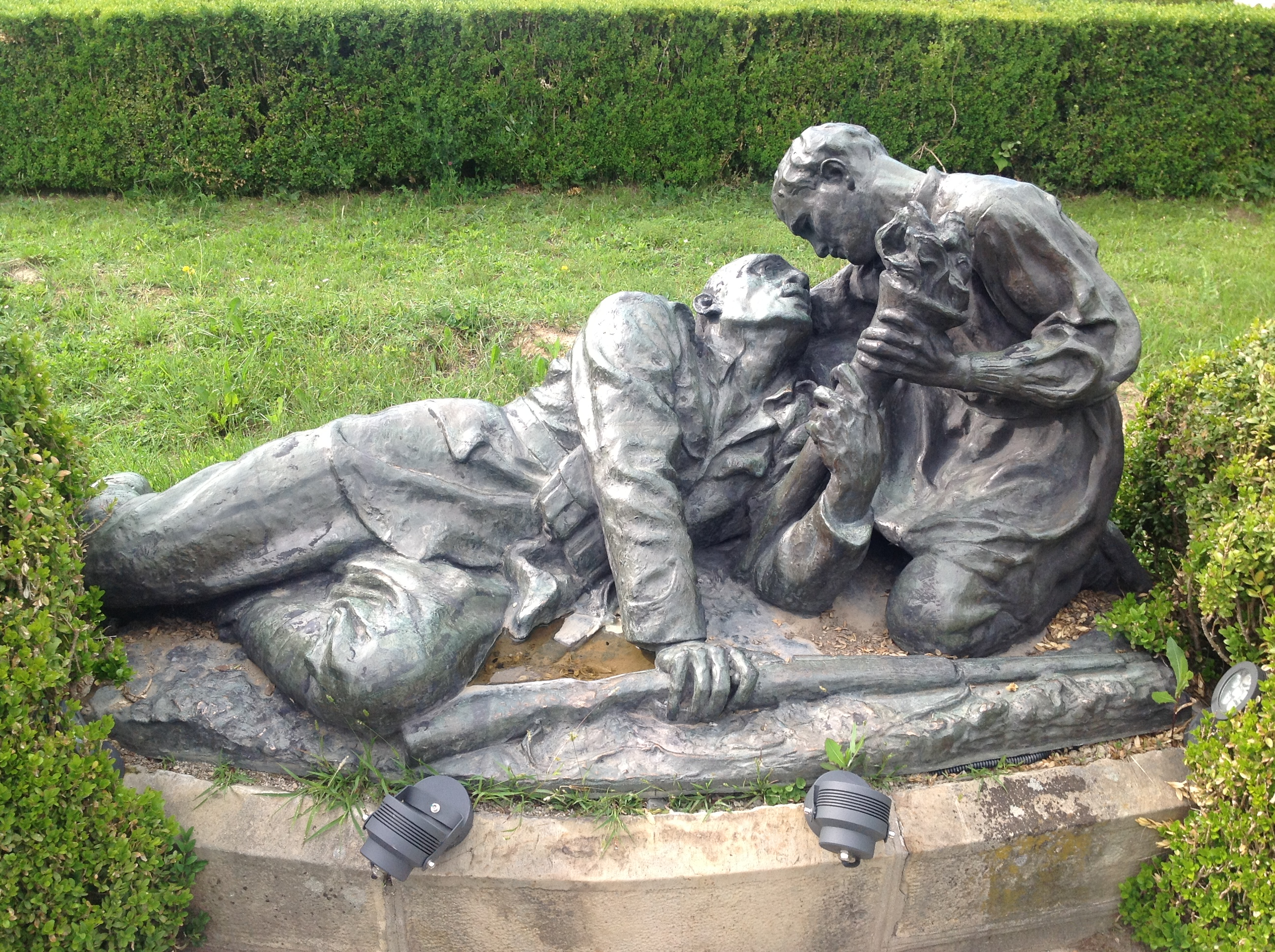

== See also ==
- Romania during World War I
- Battle of Mărășești
- Battle of Mărăști
- Tourism in Romania
- Seven Wonders of Romania
