= Mărășești =

- Town
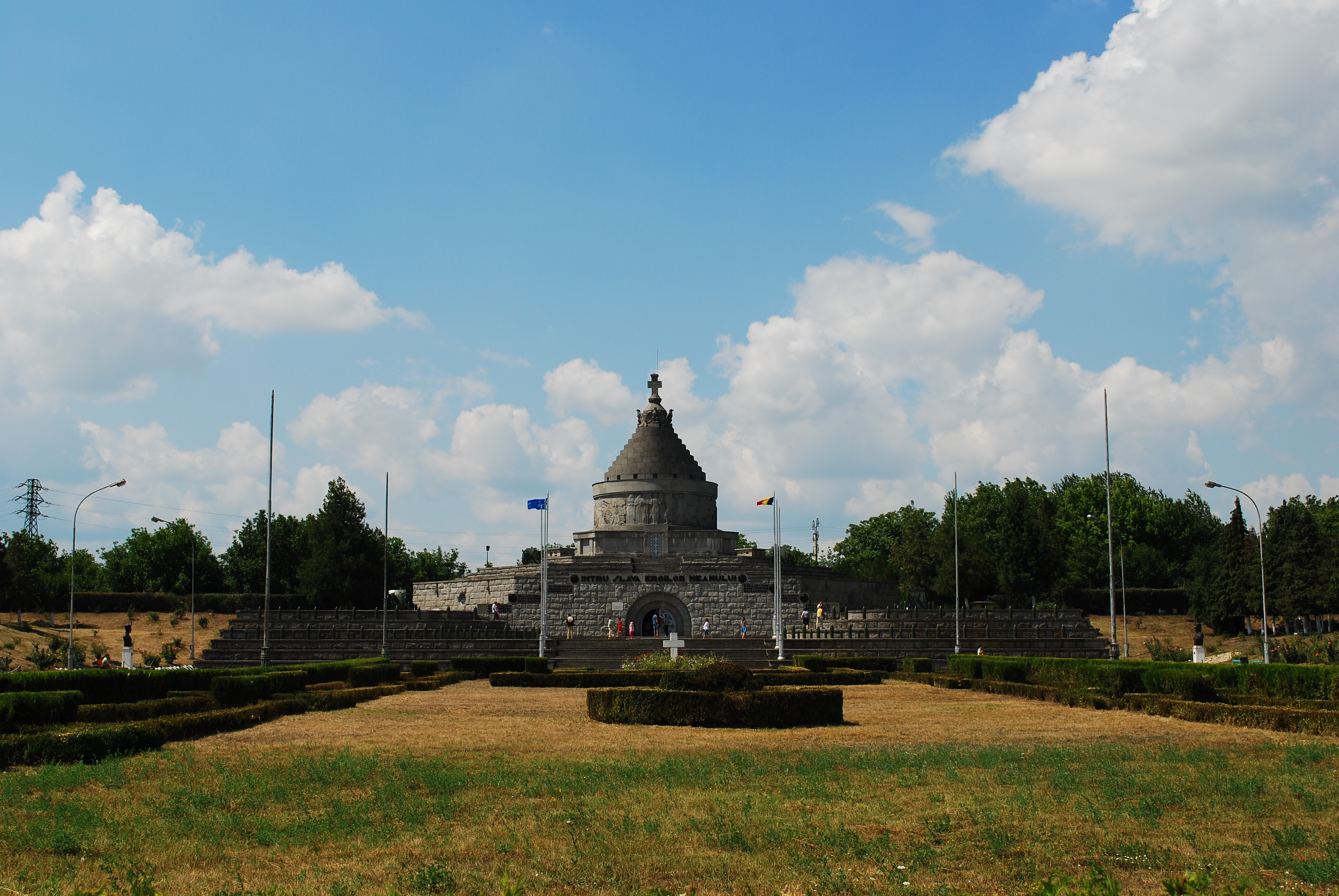
- Mausoleum of Mărășești

- Coat of arms

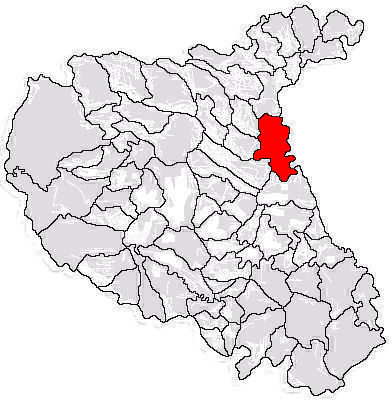
- Location in Vrancea County

- Location in Romania
- Coordinates: 45°52′48″N 27°13′48″E
- Country: Romania
- County: Vrancea

Government
  - Mayor (2024–2028): Adrian Toderașc (PSD)
- Area: 92 km^{2} (36 sq mi)
- Elevation: 62 m (203 ft)
- Population (2021-12-01): 11,314
  - Density: 120/km^{2} (320/sq mi)
- Time zone: UTC+02:00 (EET)
  - Summer (DST): UTC+03:00 (EEST)
- Postal code: 625200
- Area code: +(40) 237
- Vehicle reg.: VN
- Website: primariamarasesti.ro

Mărășești (Romanian pronunciation: [mərəˈʃeʃtʲ]) is a small town in Vrancea County, Western Moldavia, Romania. It administers six villages: Călimănești, Haret, Modruzeni, Pădureni, Siretu, and Tișița.

== Geography ==
The town is located in the eastern part of the county, on the border with Galați County. It is 20 km (12 mi) north of the county seat, Focșani. Mărășești lies on the right bank of the river Siret, which separates it from Galați County, in the area where the Siret receives the waters of the rivers Șușița and Zăbrăuț.

== History ==
Historical population
Year	Pop.	±%
1930	4,532	—
1948	4,940	+9.0%
1956	5,604	+13.4%
1966	6,795	+21.3%
1977	10,521	+54.8%
1992	12,370	+17.6%
2002	11,777	−4.8%
2011	10,671	−9.4%
2021	11,314	+6.0%
Source: Census data

King Milan I of Serbia was born in Mărășești on 22 August 1854.

In 1917 during World War I, the Battle of Mărășești between the Kingdom of Romania and the German Empire was fought near the town. It was the last major battle between the German Empire and the Kingdom of Romania on the Romanian front during World War I. A mausoleum containing the remains of 5,073 Romanian soldiers was built to commemorate the Romanian victory.

Maria Zaharia (1905–1917) was born in Pădureni village. She acted as an impromptu artillery observer for the Romanian Army and was killed during the Battle of Mărășești. She is buried at the Mausoleum of Mărășești, the only child who is laid to rest there.

== See also ==
- Battle of Mărășești
- Mausoleum of Mărășești
