= Battle of Mărășești =

1917 battle during the Romanian Campaign of World War I

Coordinates: 45.8800°N 27.1348°E

- Part of the 1917 Romanian Campaign of World War I
- Map of the battle on its first day (6 August 1917)
Date	6 August – 3 September 1917
Location	Mărășești, Vrancea, Eastern Romania
Result	Strategic Entente victory

Belligerents
Allied Powers: Romania; Russia	Central Powers: Germany; Austria-Hungary

Commanders and leaders
(Kingdom of Romania) Constantin Cristescu (until August 11th) (Kingdom of Romania) Eremia Grigorescu (from August 12th) (Russian Republic) Alexander Ragoza	(German Empire) Johannes von Eben: (German Empire) Karl von Wenninger †; (German Empire) Curt von Morgen

Units involved
(Kingdom of Romania) Romanian 1st Army (Russian Republic) Russian 4th Army	(German Empire) German 9th Army: (German Empire) XVIII Reserve Corps; (German Empire) I Reserve Corps

Strength
Romanian; 78 battalions 58 cavalry squadrons 150 batteries (36 heavy); 10 trench mortars 7 anti-aircraft guns 12 air squadrons Russian: 84 battalions 32 cavalry squadrons 79 batteries (9 heavy)	102 battalions 10 cavalry squadrons 213 batteries (31 heavy)

Casualties and losses
(Kingdom of Romania) 27,410 (5,125 killed, 9,818 missing, 12,467 wounded) (Russian Republic) 25,650 (7,083 killed, 8,167 missing, 10,400 wounded); Total: 53,060 (12,208 killed, 17,985 missing, 22,867 wounded)	(German Empire) (Austria-Hungary) 60,000–65,000 casualties (killed, missing, wounded); Total: 60,000+

The Battle of Mărășești (6 August 1917 – 3 September 1917) was the last major battle fought by the Central Powers against the Kingdom of Romania and Russia on the Romanian front during World War I. Romania was mostly occupied by the Central Powers, but the Battle of Mărășești kept the northern region of the country free from occupation.

== Background ==
Mărășești, just like Mărăști, is part of the strategically important area of the Focșani Gate. Control of this area eases attacks into several Romanian regions.

On 22 July 1917, the Romanians launched a joint offensive with Russia against the Austro-Hungarian 1st Army, around Mărăști and the lower part of the Siret river, which resulted in the Battle of Mărăști. Although there was some initial success, a counter-offensive by the Central Powers in Galicia stopped the Romanian-Russian offensive.

== Battle ==
The Central Powers planned a dual pincer movement attack: an offensive towards Adjud and an offensive towards Oituz. The Battle of Mărășești was fought between 6 August and 3 September, in an area marked by the towns of Focșani, Panciu and Mărășești, along the Siret River.

West of the Siret, the German 9th Army had 12 divisions with 102 infantry battalions, 10 cavalry squadrons and 213 artillery batteries (31 heavy).

Facing the Germans was the Russian 4th Army. Its defenses were still under construction, discontinuous, and lacked depth. The Russian troops were being replaced by the Romanian 1st Army, under General Constantin Cristescu. The Romanian 1st Army had 78 infantry battalions, 58 cavalry squadrons, 114 gun and light howitzer batteries, 36 heavy batteries, 10 trench mortars, 5 air squadrons and 7 anti-aircraft guns. To these the Russian 4th Army added 84 infantry battalions, 32 cavalry squadrons and 79 artillery batteries (9 heavy).

The German offensive began on the night of 5–6 August, with a violent 8 hours-long artillery bombardment which included poison gas shells. Striking between the Siret and the Focșani-Mărășești railroad, the Germans 3–10 km (1.9–6.2 mi) northwards against the left flank of the Russian 4th Army. Although they left behind their artillery, the Russians managed to destroy the bridges over the river. The intervention of the 5th Romanian Division in this threatened sector stabilized the situation, shelling the left flank of the Germans as they attempted to cross the river along with the Russians.

The following day, however, the Romanians lost the village of Doaga. During a subsequent Romanian-Russian counterattack against 4 German divisions, the Russians managed to advance 3 km (1.9 mi) and the Romanians 1–2 km (0.62–1.24 mi). However, the Russians were driven back during the following night, driving a 4–5 km (2.5–3.1 mi) wedge between the Romanian 9th Division and the Russian 71st Division, whose combat power was collapsing as whole units abandoned their positions.

The commander of the Russian 4th Army decided to delay the counterattack, allowing the Germans to advance towards Mărășești and threaten the rear of the Romanian 9th Division. Communication between the two Allied armies was restored by the infantry and artillery of the Romanian 13th Division. By the end of the day, the German counterattack forced the Romanians and Russians to abandon their recently made gains. This Allied counteroffensive, between 10 and 11 August, did not yield notable results, apart from the casualties inflicted upon the Central Powers, although at the cost of heavy Russian and Romanian casualties.

On 12–13 August two more Romanian divisions were committed to battle. The Romanian resistance forced the German 9th Army to shift the focus of its offensive to the junction between the Russian 4th and Romanian 1st Armies, hoping to coordinate its attack with the one delivered by the Gerok Group at Oituz.

On the morning of 14 August, after a powerful artillery bombardment with high explosive and gas shells, the Germans attacked the Russian troops at Panciu and pushed them back, threatening the left flank of the Romanian 2nd Army at Oituz. The attempt to seize Mărășești, at the left flank of the Romanian 1st Army (commanded by General Eremia Grigorescu since 12 August) failed.

On the next day, German troops advancing southeast of Panciu were halted by units of the Romanian 1st Army, supported by accurate Romanian-Russian artillery fire. German prisoners reported extremely heavy casualties, stating that they "had not come across such stiff resistance since the battles of the Somme and Verdun".

On 16 August Romanian troops checked a German advance north of Panciu. Between 17 and 18 August, besides some local skirmishes, the forces in the field mainly regrouped.

The Romanian 1st Army deployed 53 Romanian and 21 Russian light batteries and 19 heavy batteries. On 19 August, the Battle of Mărășești reached its peak, the German attack being simultaneous with the attack from Oituz, obviously attempting to encircle the Romanian and Russian forces. The formidable artillery bombardment began at daybreak, with gas shells fired mainly against the Romanian divisions. The Central Powers attacked with 4 German and 1 Austro-Hungarian divisions, against the Romanian 9th, 10th and 13th and Russian 14th and 103rd Divisions. The main blow was directed 3 km (1.9 mi) east of Mărășești, and the Germans advanced 2 km (1.2 mi) in the middle of the Romanian position, towards the Siret Valley, only to be pushed back with heavy losses by a converging counterattack. Guided by aircraft and balloons observation, the Romanian artillery inflicted heavy losses in combat and materiel. The Germans launched a powerful attack on Mărășești, but only reached the railway station on the outskirts of the town.

On 22 August, the Central Powers ceased their offensive, organized for defense, and settled into trench warfare. On 23 August, the Germans started bringing up more artillery.

On 28 August, Mackensen launched another attack, causing the Russians to leave the battlefield in large numbers after showing little resistance. The Romanians were able to reinforce their lines before Mackensen could exploit the Russian collapse, completely stopping his advance.

This was the most important battle ever fought by the Romanian Army, as it managed to completely stop Mackensen's intended invasion of Moldavia. Mackensen halted the attack on 3 September in order to transfer troops to the Italian Front. The Germans had pushed forward 6–7 km (3.7–4.3 mi) along a front of 30 km (19 mi), but at great cost and without achieving any major objective. German casualties (killed, wounded and missing) amounted to around 60,000 men, while Romanian casualties amounted to 27,000.

== Aftermath ==
In March 1918, Russia signed the Treaty of Brest-Litovsk after Austrian-German forces had captured huge territories in the Baltics, Belarus, and Ukraine in February. That left Romania surrounded by the Central Powers and forced them to sign an armistice and the Treaty of Bucharest.

German chemist Eduard Buchner, who won the 1907 Nobel Prize in Chemistry for his work on fermentation, was killed in the battle at Focșani. His left femur had been injured by a shell at Bătinești on 11 August, and he died of his wounds two days later at a field hospital in Focșani, where he is buried. He had the rank of Major and commanded artillery units.

== Gallery ==
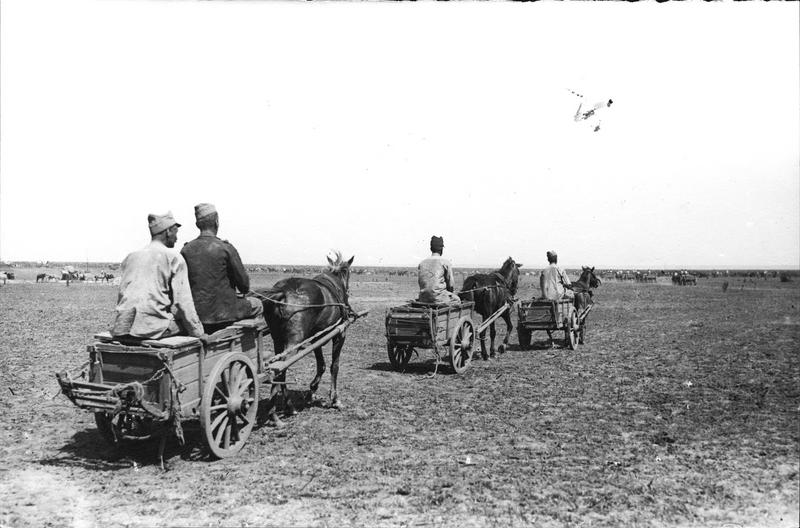
Convoy of mountain artillery boxes, heading for the Mărășești front

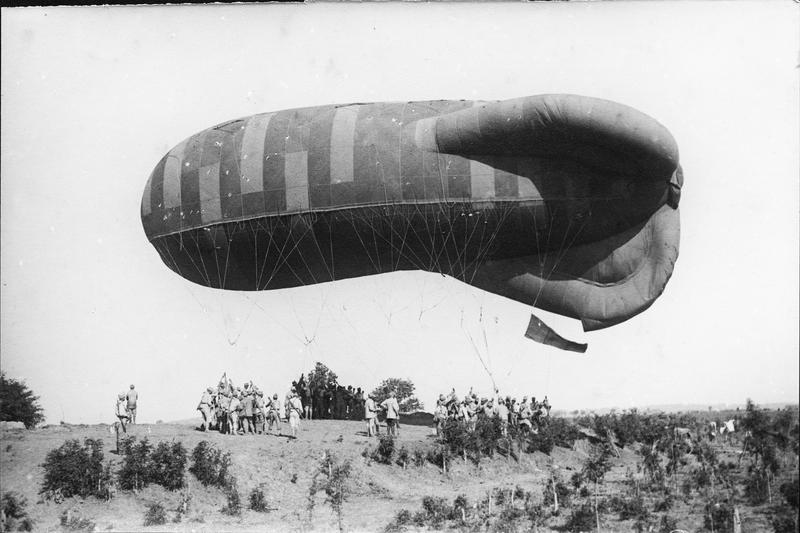
Tethered balloon at the Battle of Mărășești

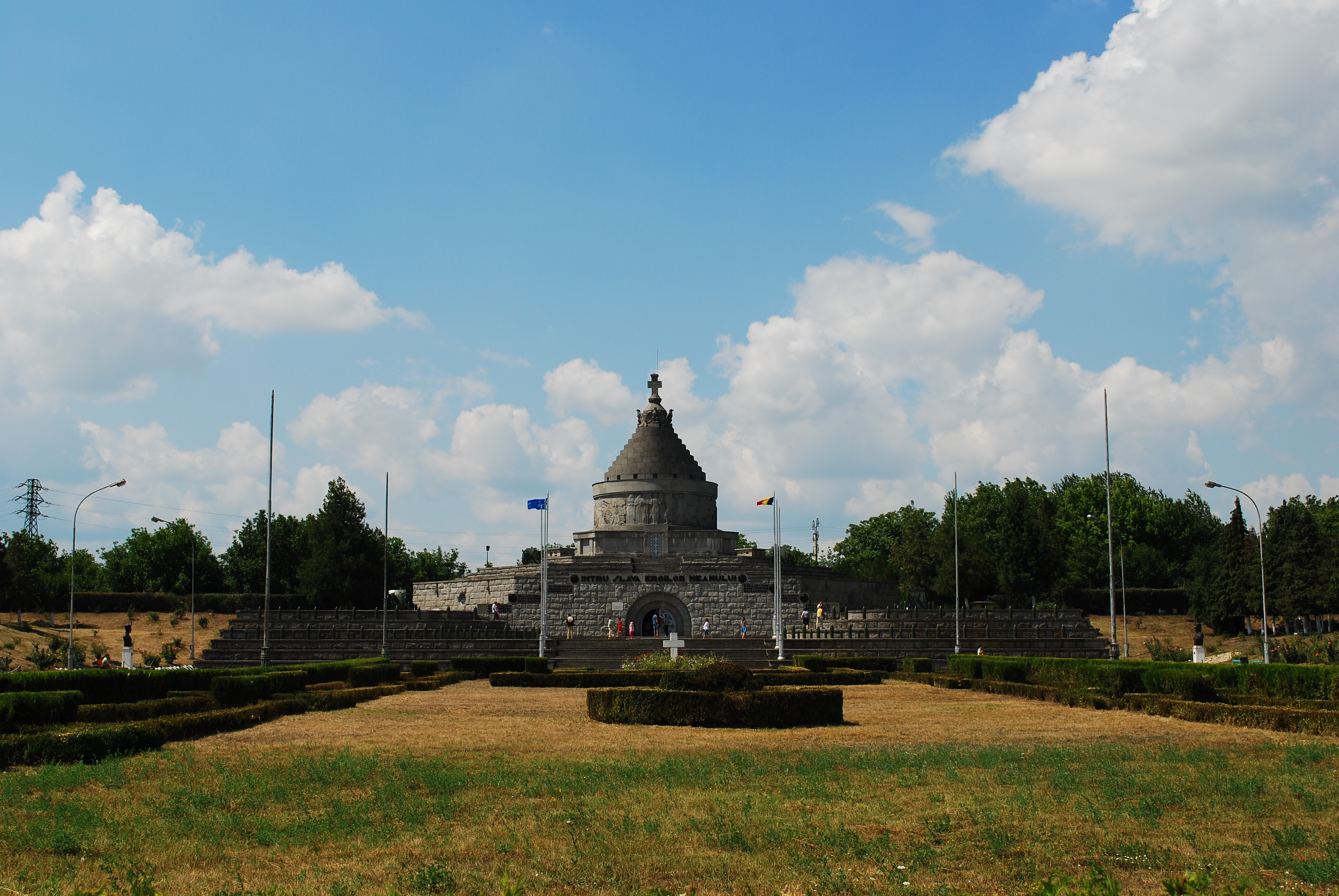
Mausoleum of Mărășești

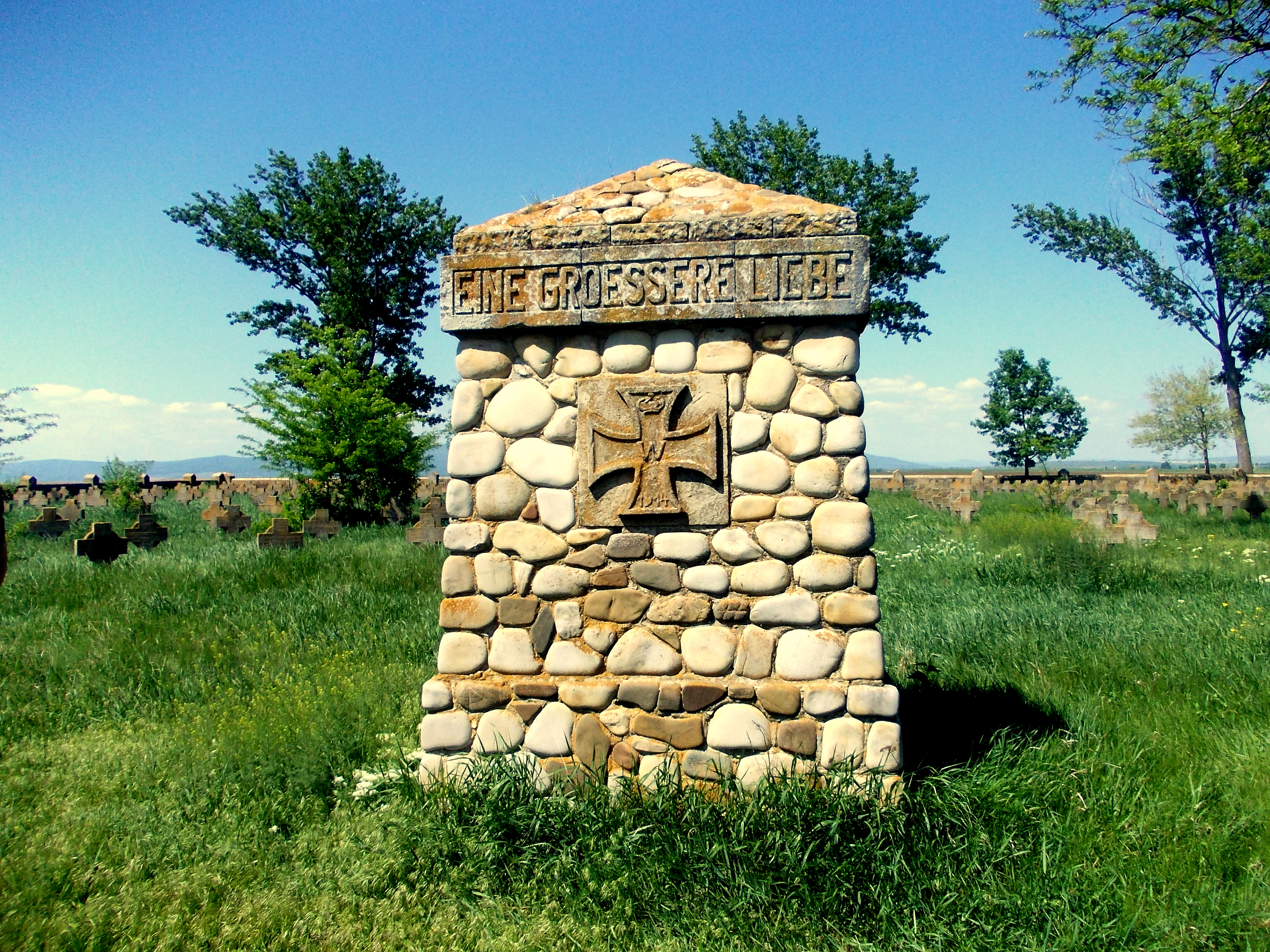
German cemetery

== See also ==
- Battle of Mărăști
- Kázím Abdulakim
- Mausoleum of Mărășești
- Romania during World War I
