= Oituz =

- Commune
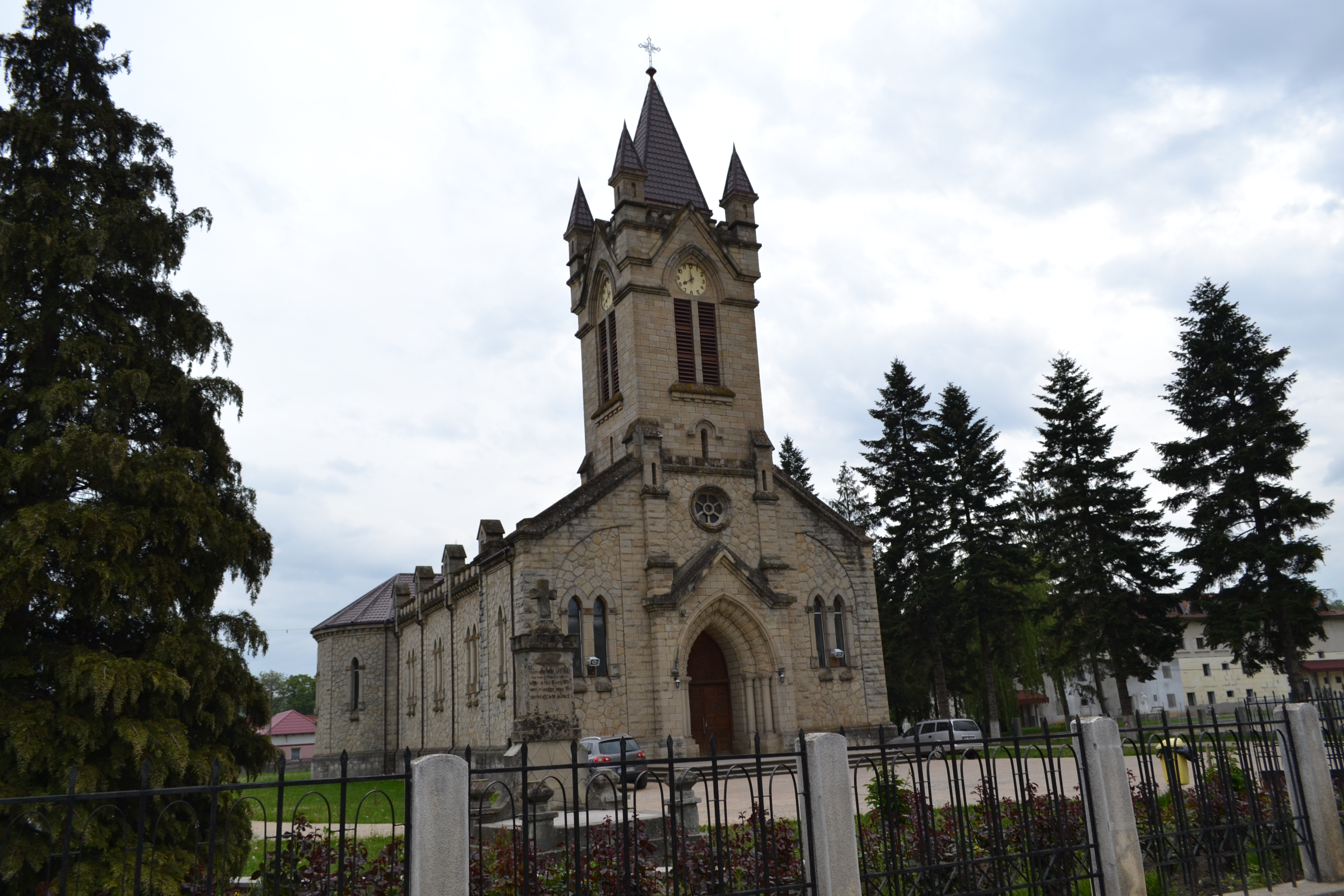
- Catholic church in Oituz

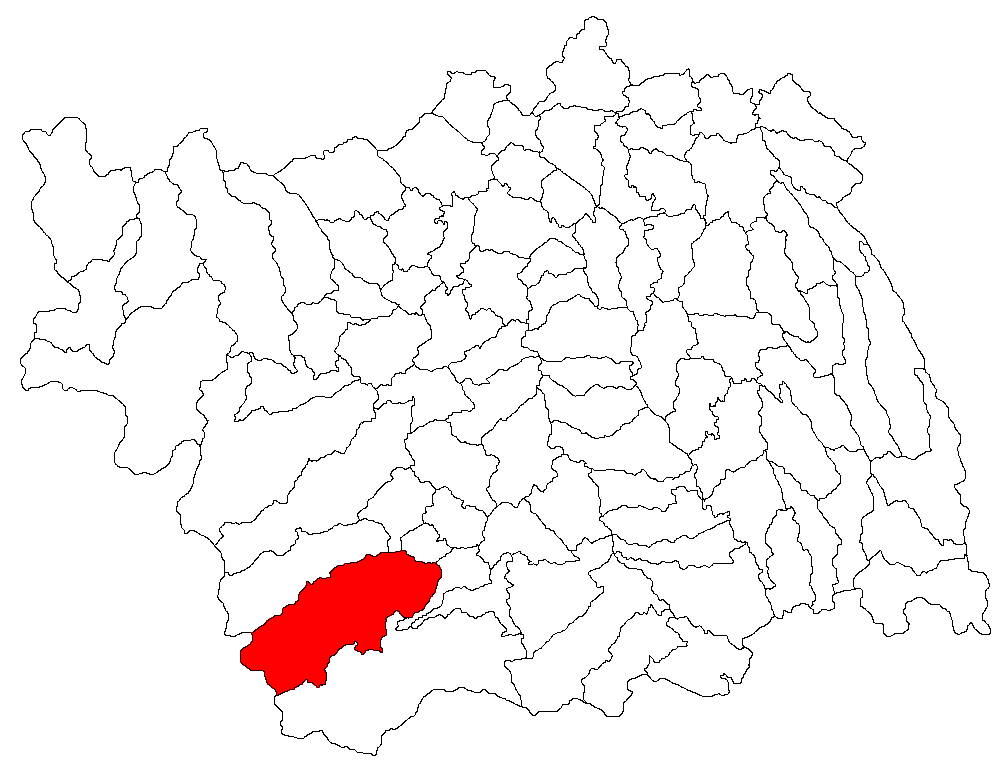
- Location in Bacău County

- Location in Romania
- Coordinates: 46°12′N 26°37′E
- Country: Romania
- County: Bacău

Government
  - Mayor (2020–2024): Claudiu Petrișor (PNL)
- Area: 202.23 km^{2} (78.08 sq mi)
- Elevation: 279 m (915 ft)
- Population (2021-12-01): 8,701
  - Density: 43.03/km^{2} (111.4/sq mi)
- Time zone: UTC+02:00 (EET)
  - Summer (DST): UTC+03:00 (EEST)
- Postal code: 607365
- Area code: +(40) 234
- Vehicle reg.: BC
- Website: primariaoituz.ro

Oituz (formerly Grozești; Hungarian: Gorzafalva) is a commune in Bacău County, Western Moldavia, Romania. It is composed of six villages: Călcâi (Zöldlonka), Ferestrău-Oituz (Fűrészfalva), Hârja (Herzsa), Marginea, Oituz, and Poiana Sărată (Sósmező).

Oituz was the site of three battles during the First World War: the First, Second, and the Third Battle of Oituz.

According to Iorgu Iordan, the commune's name is of Turkic origin; otuz or oltuz means "thirty" in some Turkic languages.

Poiana Sărată village is part of Transylvania; in Austria-Hungary, it belonged to Háromszék County, and after a reorganization to Trei Scaune County in Romania until 1950.

== Demographics ==
At the 2002 census, Oituz had a population of 9,687, of which 99.8% were ethnic Romanians and 0.2% Hungarians; 49.2% were Romanian Orthodox, 48.9% Roman Catholic, and 1.8% Seventh-day Adventist. At the 2011 census, the population had decreased to 8,152; of those, 96.74% were Romanians. At the 2021 census, Oituz had 8,701 inhabitants, of which 93.41% were Romanians.

== Villages ==
=== Hârja ===
Hârja village lies along the Oituz Valley, on the national road DN11 connecting Onești to Brașov, over a stretch of approximately 3 kilometers. It was established around the middle of the 17th century by shepherd families migrating from Rucăr and Dragoslavele (Muscel), Soveja (Vrancea), and Poiana Sibiului (Sibiu County). They settled in the area due to its extensive pastures and rich hayfields suitable for sheep farming.

The first nucleus of the settlement developed on the left bank of the Oituz River, later expanding into two smaller hamlets — Flocăești and Jăvrenii — situated on the right bank. In the 20th century, it served as the seat of a commune that included Poiana Sărată and Oituz. After the 1968 territorial reorganization, the administrative center was established at Oituz village. During World War I, Hârja was a key point on the Oituz front. Between 30 September and 13 October 1916, the Battle of Hârja took place there, a tactical engagement that helped stop the advance of the Central Powers through the Oituz Pass.

== Natives ==
- Eugen Cristescu (1895–1950), head of Siguranța Statului and of the Secret Intelligence Service, convicted in 1946 as a war criminal
- Aurora Gruescu (1914–2005), world's first female forestry engineer and first Romanian person in the Guinness Book
- Ghiță Popp (1883–1967), journalist and politician
