= Battle of Oituz =

The Battle of Oituz may refer to any of the following battles between Austro-Hungarian and German forces against Romanian ones during World War I:

- First Battle of Oituz, 12–27 October 1916
- Second Battle of Oituz, 10–16 November 1916
- Third Battle of Oituz, 8–22 August 1917
