= Second Battle of Oituz =

1916 battle

- Part of World War I
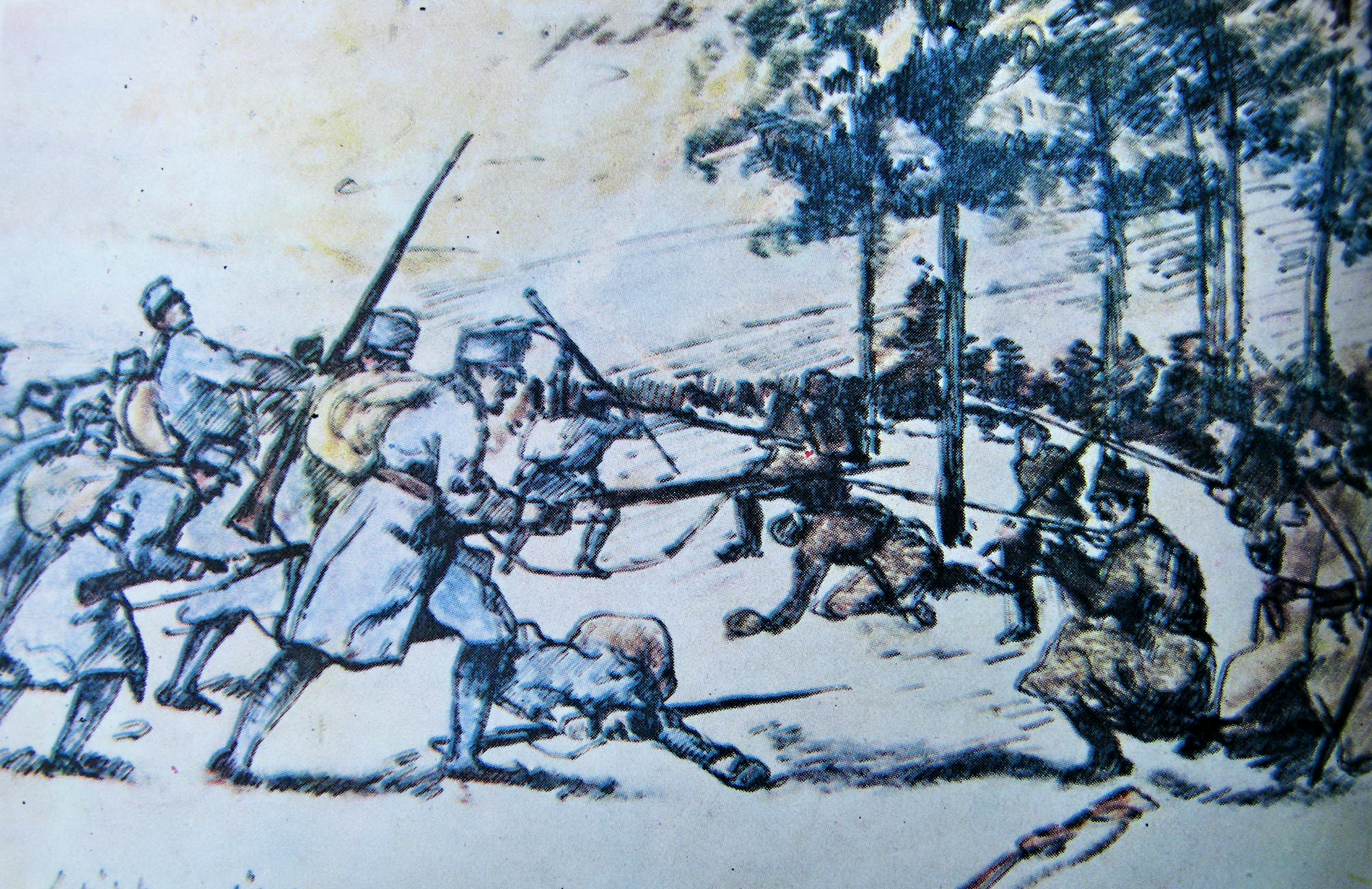
- An Austro-Hungarian attack being repulsed
Date	10–16 November 1916
Location	Border of Austria-Hungary and Romania (today in Bacău and Covasna counties, eastern Romania)
Result	Romanian victory

Belligerents
Romania	Austria-Hungary (German Empire) Germany

Commanders and leaders
(Romania) Constantin Prezan (Romania) Eremia Grigorescu (Romania) Nicolae Sinescu	(Austria-Hungary) Arthur Arz von Straußenburg (German Empire) Friedrich von Gerok

Strength
15th Infantry Division; Detachments from 2nd Cavalry Division; Detachments from 8th Infantry Division	71st Austro-Hungarian Infantry Division; 1st Austro-Hungarian Cavalry Division; 8th Bavarian Reserve Division

The Second Battle of Oituz was fought between 10 November and 16 November 1916. The Romanian forces, led by Brigadier-General Eremia Grigorescu, faced off against an Austro-Hungarian and German force led by Friedrich von Gerok. The battle resulted in the failure of the attempt by the Central Powers to force the Carpathian Mountains and enter the Siret valley in order to cut the Romanian forces in two.

== Background ==
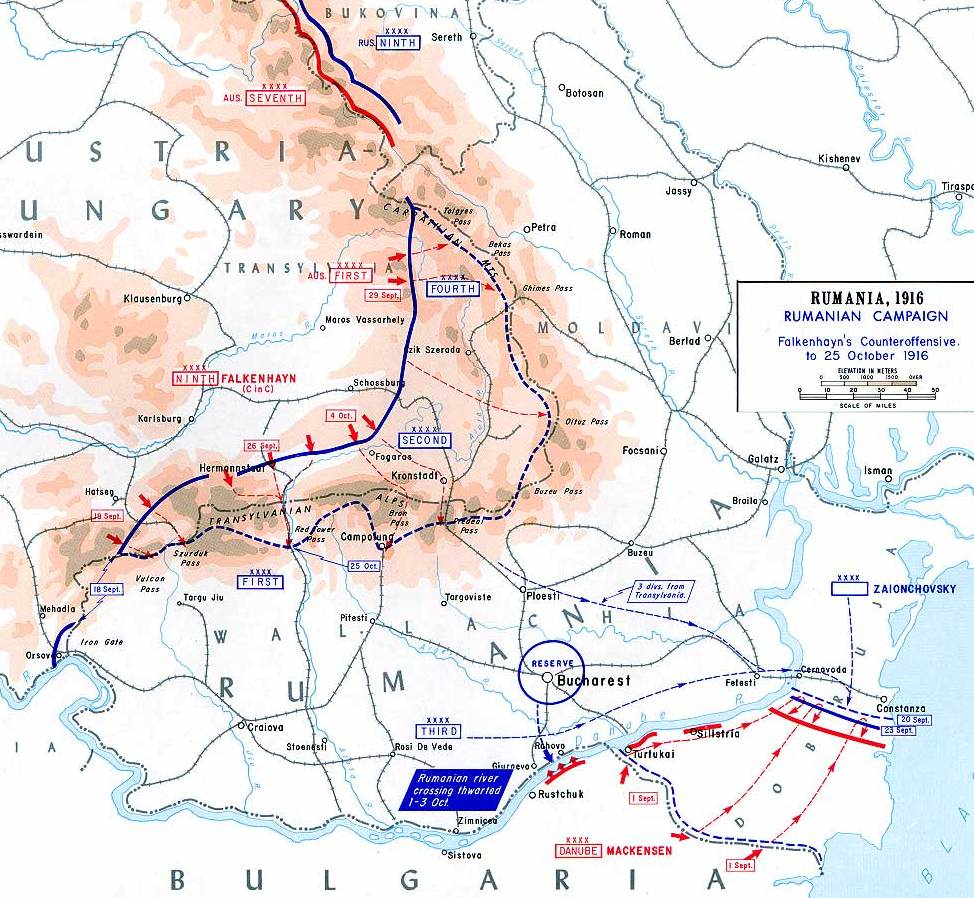
Military operations in Romania, September-October 1916

The First Battle of Oituz was part of the defense of the passes of the Carpathian Mountains by the Romanian Army. It lasted from late September to the beginning of October, and had three main objectives: stopping the offensive on the Transylvanian front, consolidating a defensive position in the Carpathians and allowing for an eventual resumption of the offensive by the Romanian forces.

Austro-Hungarian and German forces, under the command of Archduke Charles I of Austria, heir to the Austro-Hungarian throne, consisted of three armies: the 7th Austro-Hungarian Army in Bukovina, the 1st Army between Nagy-Küküllő (Târnava Mare) and the Olt, and the 9th German army, under Erich von Falkenhayn, in the southern part of the front.

The initial plan of the Central Powers' offensive was for a two-pronged assault: the Austro-Hungarian 1st Army would attack in the Tatros-Ojtoz (Trotuș-Oituz) area with the aim of occupying the pass and interrupting lines of communication across the Siret valley to prevent the arrival of Russian aid, while the German 9th Army had as its objective "the opening of the road over the mountains to Bucharest, on the shortest way, so that the entire western territory of Muntenia would be cut as with a knife". If these two operations were successful, the plan provided for a third operation which consisted of crossing the Danube by the forces under the command of August von Mackensen. This would allow carrying out a concentrated attack on Bucharest.

The general plan of the German 9th Army's offensive provided for a rapid crossing of the mountains "before [the Romanians] had time to settle in the existing fortification works on the heights of the border crossings". For this purpose, the Romanian forces that were defending the passes of the Southern Carpathians were to be attacked successively, in order to occupy one of them by surprise and thus facilitate the passage of the bulk of the German forces south of the Carpathians.

The Romanian plan of operations provided for the transition to strategic defense on the entire northern front and the maintenance by the three armies (1st, 2nd and North) of the Carpathian front until the arrival of winter, when heavy snowfall in the mountains would prevent further operations.

== Order of battle ==
=== Romanians ===
The Romanian forces were represented by the Oituz Group (Brigadier General Eremia Grigorescu), occupying a position centered on the Oituz valley, consisting of the 15th Infantry Division reinforced with forces from the 2nd Cavalry Division (Brigadier General Nicolae Sinescu) and the 8th Infantry Division, in the reserve of the Northern Army.

At the end of October, the commander of the Oituz Group decided to regroup the forces, constituting six tactical detachments (Slănic, Cernica, Oituz, Stăneica, Măguricea and Cașin), and kept four infantry battalions and the 4th Cavalry Brigade as reserves in Grozești (now Oituz) and at Mănăstirea Cașin. The commander of the Northern Army sent, as a reinforcement to the 15th Infantry Division, the 29th Infantry Regiment of the 8th Infantry Division, stating that it should be used only "in case of great need".

=== Central Powers ===
In the two weeks following the First Battle of Oituz, a new group was formed on the right wing of the Austro-Hungarian First Army. It consisted of the 71st Austro-Hungarian Infantry Division, the 1st Austro-Hungarian Cavalry Division and the 8th Bavarian Reserve Division, under the command of German General Friedrich von Gerok. The group's reserve consisted of the 24th Austro-Hungarian Infantry Division, located in Kézdivásárhely (Târgu Secuiesc). The 3rd German Cavalry Division commanded by General Eberhard von Schmettow was stationed centrally in Brassó (Brașov), able to be deployed immediately to exploit the success, in case the Romanian front was broken, either in the gorge of the Jiu or in the Oituz.

== Battle ==
=== Prelude and Austro-Hungarian attacks ===
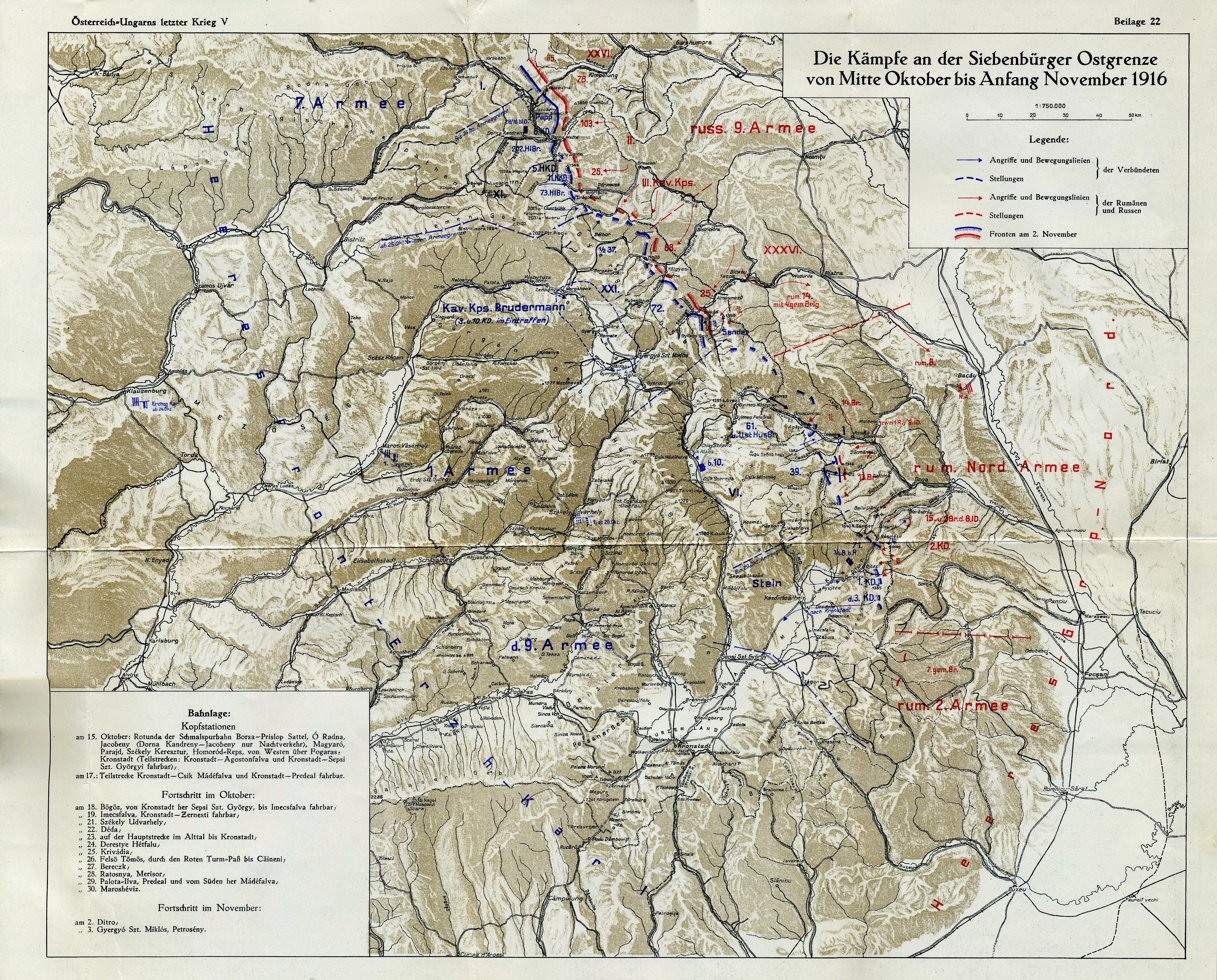
A map of the front at the beginning of November. The positions of the Romanian North Army (rum. Nord Armee, in red) and its Austro-Hungarian and German counterparts are indicated near the site of the battle.

The planned military action was part of the directive received from the German leadership, on 25 September, which provided that, in addition to the effort "in the general direction of Bucharest", immediate action should be taken, with infantry and strong cavalry, through the Oituz pass to Târgu Ocna, in order to cut off the Romanians' communications with Moldavia, thus preventing the influx of Russian reinforcements to Muntenia.

The Austro-Hungarian 7th Hussars (part of the 1st Cavalry Division), which had taken up positions on Lipse-tető (a peak with a summit at 1390 m) on the 9th, were pushed back by the Romanians on the 10th. On the same day, troops of the 19th Bavarian Reserve Infantry Regiment attached to the 71st Infantry Division took the Gyalu Leszpedin (Dealu Lespedii) peak (998 m, situated three kilometers northwest of Sósmező (Poiana Sărată), and held it in the face of violent counterattacks. This sparked a very costly fight for both sides in the Oituz pass. Romanian general Constantin Prezan called on troops in the North Army to counter-attack on the 11th and push back the opposition from the border, although it is not clear whether this was in response to the advance by the XXI Austro-Hungarian Corps, which begun on the 8th.

=== Romanian attack ===
In any case, on the 11th, the Romanians attacked in three columns over an extended area, with the aim of pinning the forces present and prevent the transfer of reinforcements elsewhere along the front by causing heavy losses to their opponents. The reinforced 71st Division withstood this with ease, but the front of the 1st Cavalry Division was pushed back from their position eight kilometers east of the Oituz, which in turn threatened to cut off the supply line of the 71st Division. Generalmajor Goldbach left a battalion from the 82nd Székely (Hungarian) Infantry Regiment to defend the heights and put another from his sparse reserves behind the cavalry at Klárák. The Romanians, who had worked their way up to the Tömlő-Hordó peak (1364 m), withdrew. The attacks continued on the 12th, with the Bavarians having to push back eight successive assaults on the recently captured border heights, which were carried out impetuously, to the sound of music. An order from the Chief of the Austrian General Staff, Franz Conrad von Hötzendorf, placed four battalions and five batteries in reserve at Kézdivásárhely to reinforce the defenders of the pass.

The 13th saw further action, the 71st Division bearing the brunt of an assault by the Romanian 15th Infantry Division. An assault on a ridge northwest of Sósmező was repulsed in the morning at heavy cost to the attackers, but troops on the Runcul Mare peak (1108 m) suffered a punishing artillery bombardment, and the 82nd Infantry Regiment, which had already been under flanking fire for several days, suffered considerably. In the afternoon, the Romanian attack struck home and took the ridge, threatening again the 71st Division. Counter-attacks attempted in the evening were unsuccessful. In the meantime, two battalions from the 19th Bavarian Reserve Infantry Regiment were relieved and sent down into the Oituz valley, and although this was part of a plan for the whole regiment to be relieved from the front, Generalmajor Goldbach had to instruct the two battalions to attack again. The first of these set out eastwards along with a Székler battalion and managed to clear out a border post which had been taken by the Romanians, and then the second was tasked to recapture the summit of the Runcul Mare after some preparation was conducted.

=== Conclusion ===
If the danger to Austro-Hungarian positions was thus averted to the east of the Oituz valley, the Gyalu Leszpedin, now held by the 5th (Bosnian) Infantry Regiment, was attacked three times during the day. Early on the 15th, the Bosnians were finally evicted from the mountain top, and a counter-attack on the 16th would yield no result. A more successful attempt was made at the Runcul Mare at dawn by the Bavarian battalion mentioned earlier, and thus pressure was relieved on the flanks of the 71st Division. General Gerok, commanding the Oituz area as a corps leader since the 15th, sent in the 36th German Landsturm Regiment on the pass road to the 71st Division, but further counter-attacks were halted due to the heavy losses suffered, meaning that the Romanians kept control of the Gyalu Leszpedin summit, which had a dominating view of the west side of the pass leading from Hârja to Băile Slănic (now Slănic-Moldova).

Rain and snowfall limited further operations, and a local temporary ceasefire was arranged on the 18th by the Romanians to bury their dead.

== Sources ==
- von Falkenhayn, Erich (1921). Der Feldzug der 9. Armee gegen die Rumänen und Russen, 1916/17 [The Campaign of the 9th Army Against the Romanians and Russians, 1916/1917] (in German). Berlin: E. S. Mittler und Sohn.
- Glaise von Horstenau, Edmund; Brauner, Josef (1932). Österreich-Ungarns letzter Krieg 1914 - 1918: Das Kriegsjahr 1916 - Die Ereignisse von August bis zur Jahreswende [Austria-Hungary's last war 1914-1918: The year 1916 - Events from August to the end of the year] (in German). Vol. 5. Vienna: Verl. der Militärwiss. Mitteilungen.
- Kirițescu, Constantin (1989). Istoria războiului pentru întregirea României [History of the war for the unification of Romania] (in Romanian). Bucharest: Editura Științifică și Enciclopedică.
- Romanian Commission of Military History (1989). Istoria militară a poporului român [The military history of the Romanian people] (in Romanian). Bucharest: Editura Militară.
- Prodan, Costică (1996). "The Battles for the Mountain Passes". Romanian Review. 51 (5/6). Europolis Pub.: 116–128. ISSN 0035-8088. OCLC 5350807.
