= Nicolae Sinescu =

Romanian general

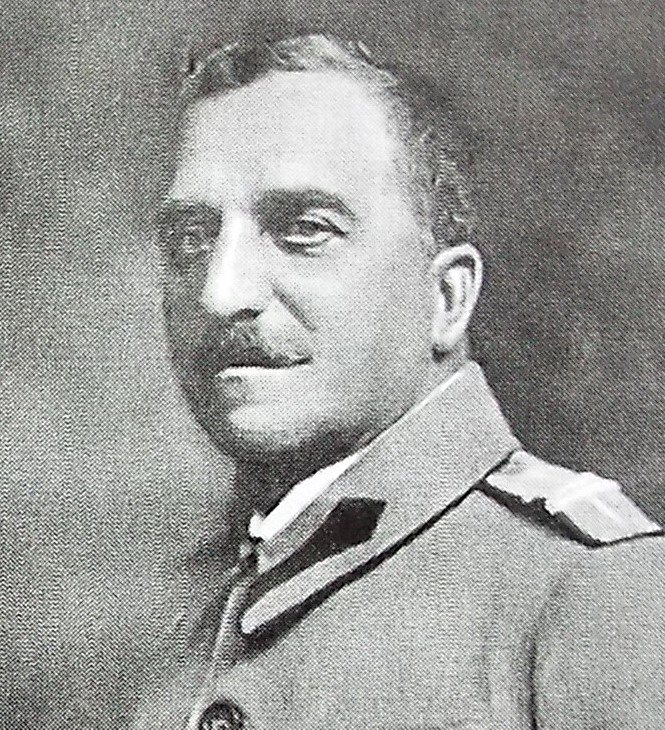
- Born: November 28, 1865
- Died: 1934
- Military career
- Allegiance: Romania
- Branch: Romanian Land Forces
- Service years: 1886 – 1917
- Rank: Major General
- Conflicts: Second Balkan War; World War I; First Battle of Oituz; Second Battle of Oituz
- Awards: Order of the Star of Romania (1912); Order of the Crown (1907); Medal for bravery and faith (1913); Cross of "Sanitary Merit" (1914)

Nicolae Sinescu (1865–1934) was one of the generals of the Romanian Land Forces in the First World War. He served as a cavalry division commander in the 1916 and 1917 campaigns.

== Biography ==
After graduating from the military school of officers with the rank of lieutenant, Nicolae Sinescu held various positions in the cavalry units or in the upper echelons of the army, the most important being the commander of the 5th Red Brigade and Inspector General of the Cavalry.

During the First World War, he served as: commander of the 2nd Cavalry Division, between November 29, 1916, to January 15, 1917, and commander of the Cavalry Corps between July 2, 1917, to December 1917.

== Bibliography ==
- Kiritescu, Constantin, History of the war for the unification of Romania, Scientific and Encyclopedic Publishing House, Bucharest, 1989
- Ioanițiu Alexandru (Lt.-Colonel), The Romanian War: 1916-1918, vol 1, Genius Printing House, Bucharest, 1929
- Romania in the World War 1916-1919, Documents, Annexes, Volume 1, Official Gazette and State Printing Offices, Bucharest, 1934
- The General Headquarters of the Romanian Army. Documents 1916 - 1920, Machiavelli Publishing House, Bucharest, 1996
- Military history of the Romanian people, vol. V, Military Publishing House, Bucharest, 1989
- Romania in the years of the First World War, Militară Publishing House, Bucharest, 1987
- "Romania in the First World War", Military Publishing House, 1979
