= Aurora Gruescu =

Female forestry engineer

- Born: November 5, 1914; Oituz, Bacău County, Kingdom of Romania
- Died: August 25, 2005 (aged 90); Bușteni, Prahova County, Romania
- Resting place: Sfânta Vineri Cemetery, Bucharest
- Education: Politehnica University of Bucharest
- Occupation: Forestry engineer
- Parents: Chiriac Dragomir (father); Maria Dragomir (mother)

Aurora Gruescu (15 May 1914 – 25 August 2005) was the world's first female forestry engineer, as well as the first Romanian person in the Guinness Book. She worked as a forestry engineer for 25 years. She made considerable contributions to the field of forestry, such as the first national afforestation plan, set on 100,000 hectares (250,000 acres), as well as the use of chemical controls of pests in forests around Bucharest.

== Biography ==
Gruescu was born in Oituz, Romania, the sixth and youngest child of the family of teachers Chiriac and Maria Dragomir. At the age of ten, she took part in a school trip that aimed to improve students' knowledge of nature. This included a visit to a forest, which had a lasting impact on Gruescu and influenced her decision to enter forestry.

After graduating in 1933 from the Royal Girls' Boarding School in Bucharest, Gruescu was encouraged by her parents to study medicine. She passed the entry exam and enrolled in the medicine program. However, she left medicine upon deciding it did not appeal to her and enrolled in the Forestry Faculty of Politehnica University of Bucharest. The following autumn, she wrote a specialization exam with 129 other candidates for 13 places, which she passed. She was the only female student in that faculty. Forestry was considered a typical male career.

== Professional work ==
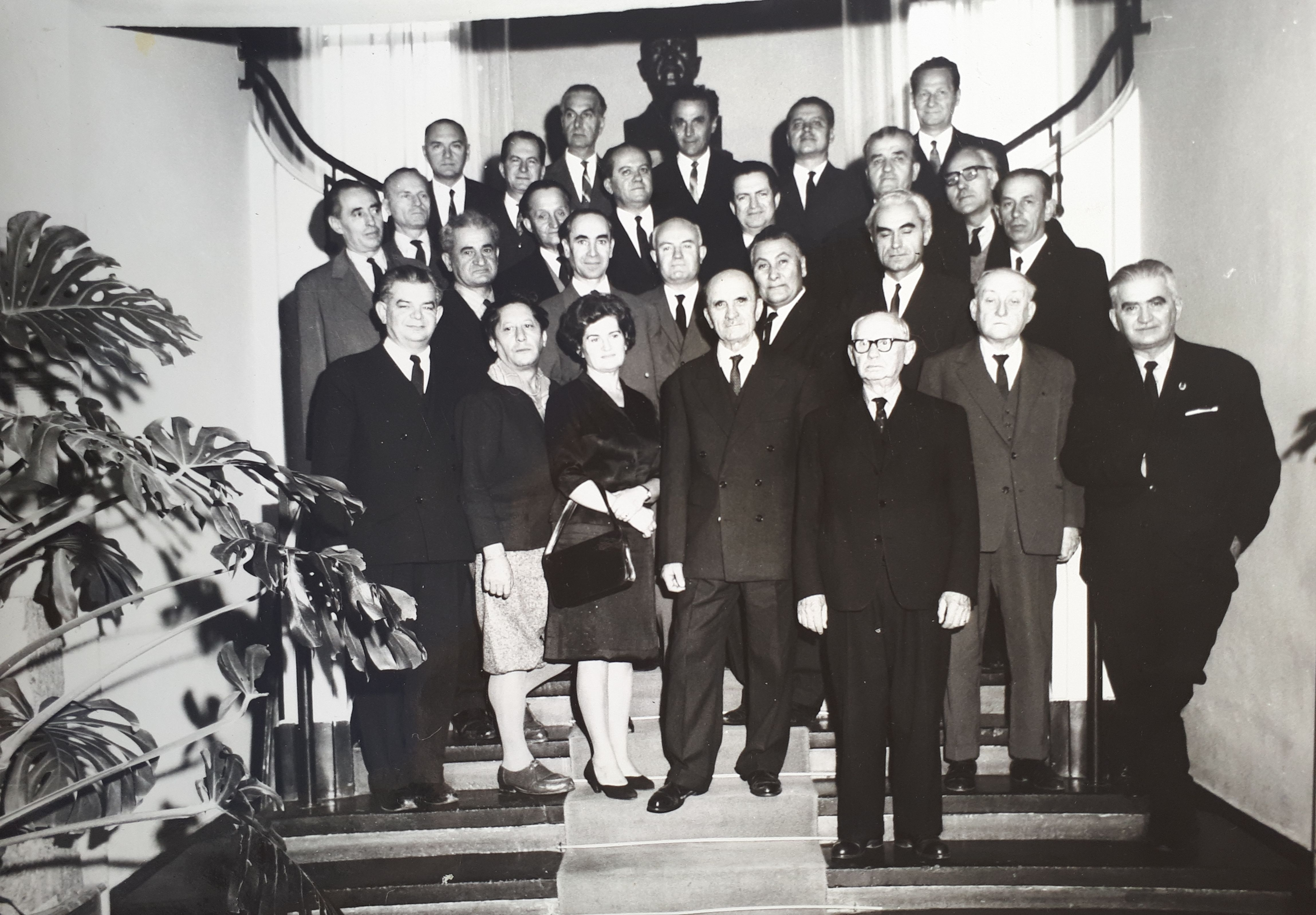
Forestry faculty professors; Gruescu is in front row, second from left

Gruescu became an example for many women seeking professional careers, as well as men and women seeking careers in forestry. She received attention from international organizations for her work. She was an honorary member of the "Progresul Silvic" Society, Prahova County branch (1992), and an honorary member of the General Association of Romanian Engineers and of the Ministry of Water, Forests and Environmental Protection (1996). After retirement in 1996, she received the Big Silver Medal at the Romania-Israel Binational Philatelic Exhibition, as well as a nomination for the title of "Personality of the Year 1997" by the American Biographical Institute. In the spring of 2002, she was named Honorary Citizen of Bușteni. She died in Bușteni on 25 August 2005 and was buried at Sfânta Vineri Cemetery in Bucharest.
