= Școala Centrală National College =

- Colegiul Național Școala Centrală
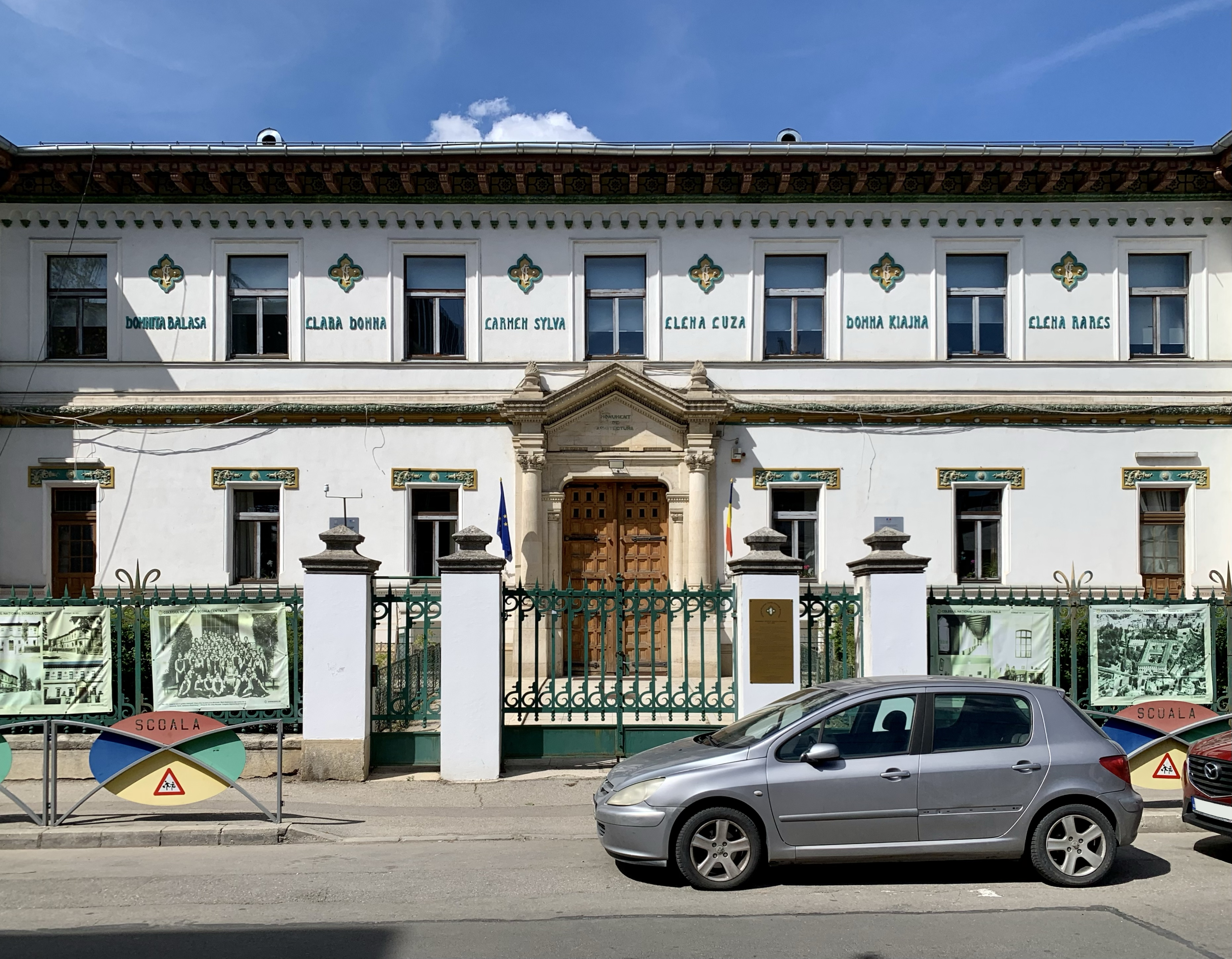
- Școala Centrală in April 2023

Location
- Strada Icoanei 3-5 Sector 2 Bucharest; Romania
- Coordinates: 44.4436°N 26.1053°E

Information
- Funding type: Public
- Established: 19 March 1851
- Status: Open
- Category: Primary school and high school
- Principal: Octavian-Lucian Popa (since 2021)
- Grades: 0 to 12
- Gender: Coeducation
- Age range: 6–19
- Enrolment: 1,462 (as of 2020)
- Average class size: 25
- Language: Romanian, bilingual teaching in French and intensively in English
- Hours in school day: 5–7
- Campus type: Urban
- Nickname: CNȘC (formerly Zoia)
- Alumni: Violeta Andrei, Agatha Bârsescu, Annie Bentoiu, Floria Capsali, Maria Cuțarida-Crătunescu, Cecilia Cuțescu-Storck, Carmen Dan, Zoe Dumitrescu-Bușulenga, Monica Ghiuță, Aurora Gruescu, Ștefania Mărăcineanu, Maia Morgenstern, Andrei Păunescu, Oana Pellea, Olga Tudorache
- Website: cnscb.ro

Școala Centrală National College (Romanian: Colegiul Național Școala Centrală; literally Central School, formerly Zoia Kosmodemianskaia or just Zoia) is an institution of pre-primary, primary, lower secondary, and upper secondary public education located at 3-5 Icoanei Street, Sector 2, Bucharest, Romania. It functioned along the passing of time under many other names, most notably Pensionatul Domnesc de Fete (i.e., 'The Royal Girls' Boarding School/Pension'). It serves schooling for the classes 0 to 12th grade, that is, from pre-primary school up to high school.

During the communist period, Școala Centrală was known as Zoia Kosmodemianskaia, a name which was ascribed to this educational institution for political reasons. After the Romanian Revolution of 1989, more specifically in 1994, the school's name was changed to Școala Centrală and bilingual French education was introduced for the classes with both humanist and exact sciences profiles pertaining to high school.

The school building, completed in 1890, is listed as a historic monument by Romania's Ministry of Culture and Religious Affairs. It was designed by Romanian architect Ion Mincu, renowned for developing the Romanian revival style (Romanian: Stilul Neo-Brâncovenesc).

== Educational status ==
The Central School of Bucharest (Romanian: Școala Centrală, for short) is considered a good to very good high school in educational regards in Bucharest and nationwide in Romania, both in terms of the admission averages for high school as well as regarding the intellectual performances of the pupils at various national scholarly olympics and international contests as well.

== Architectural style ==
The building is a masterpiece of neo-Romanian (also known as neo-Brâncovenesc) architecture, designed by Ion Mincu, being the second building erected in this style. Its beauty and prestige granted it the title of historical monument in the Romanian registry of historical monuments.

== Other usage ==
In 1918, the building was used during the Austrian occupation of Bucharest throughout late World War I as the headquarters of the local post.

== Gallery ==
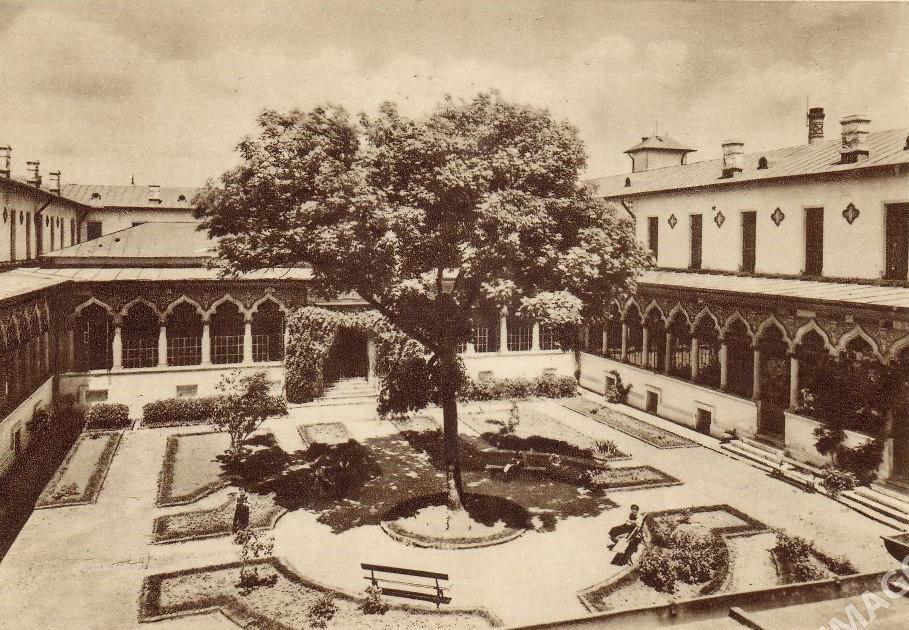
Old photo of the inner courtyard

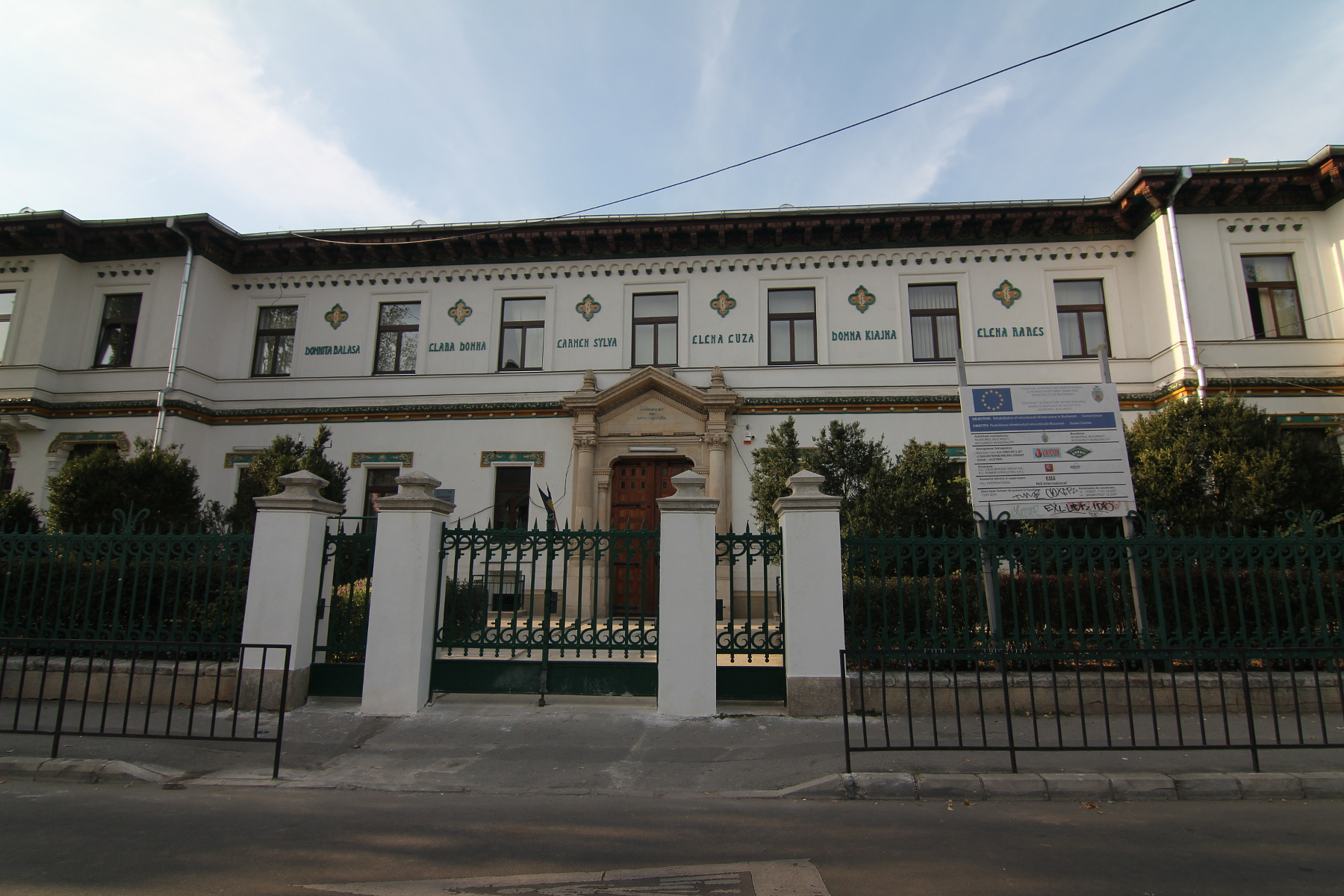
The exterior of the Central School of Bucharest, as seen in September 2012

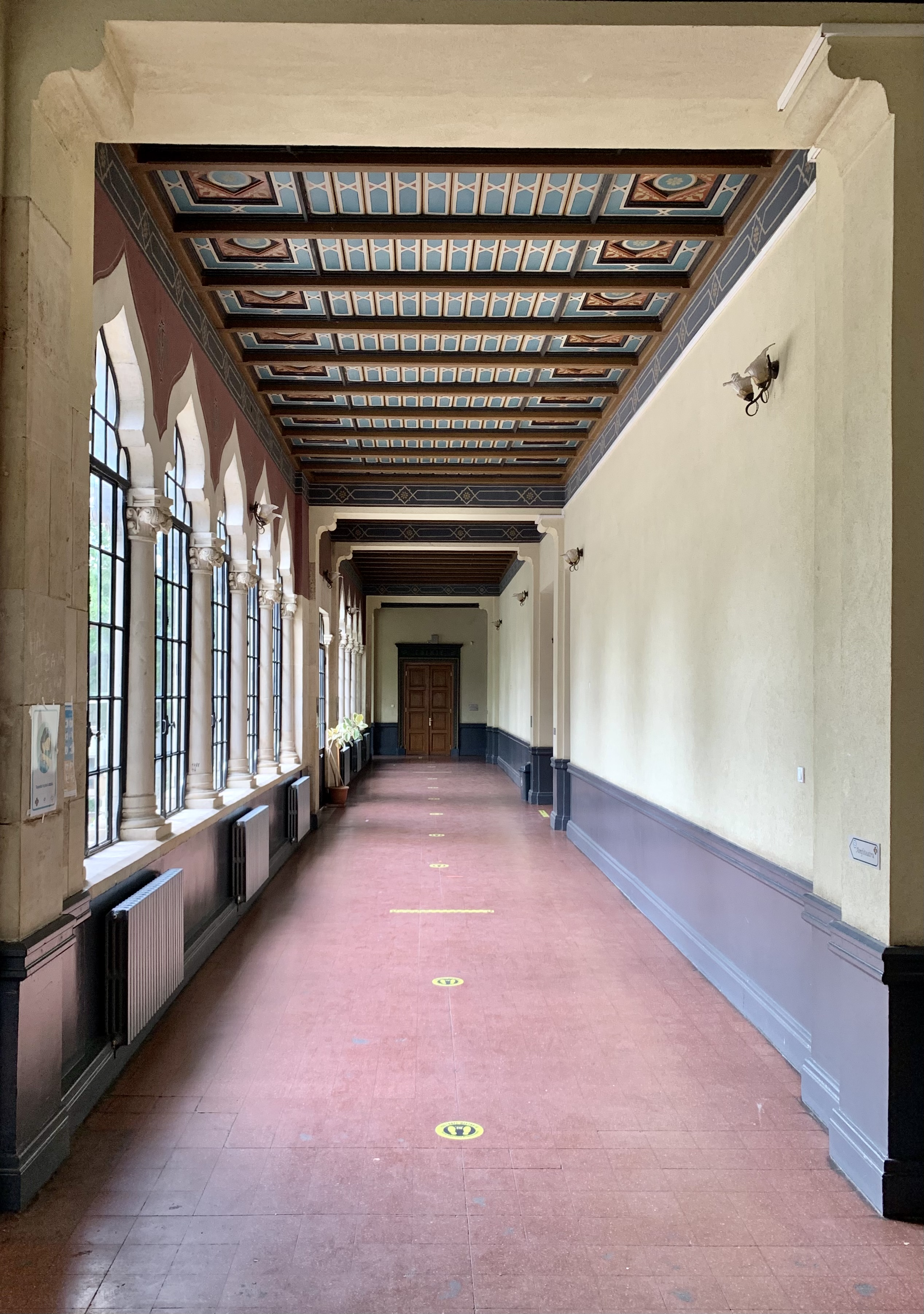
One of the main hallways

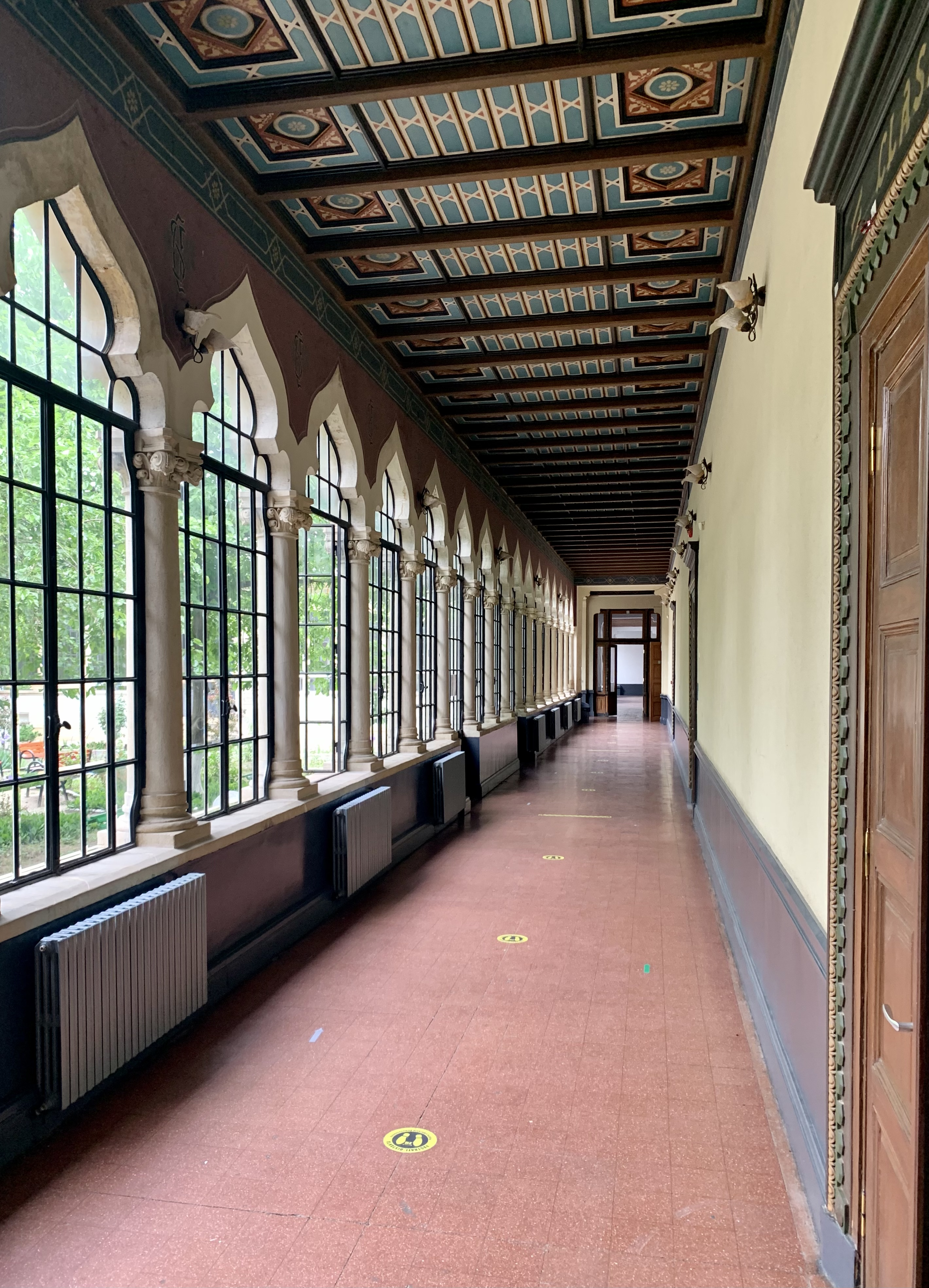
One of the main hallways

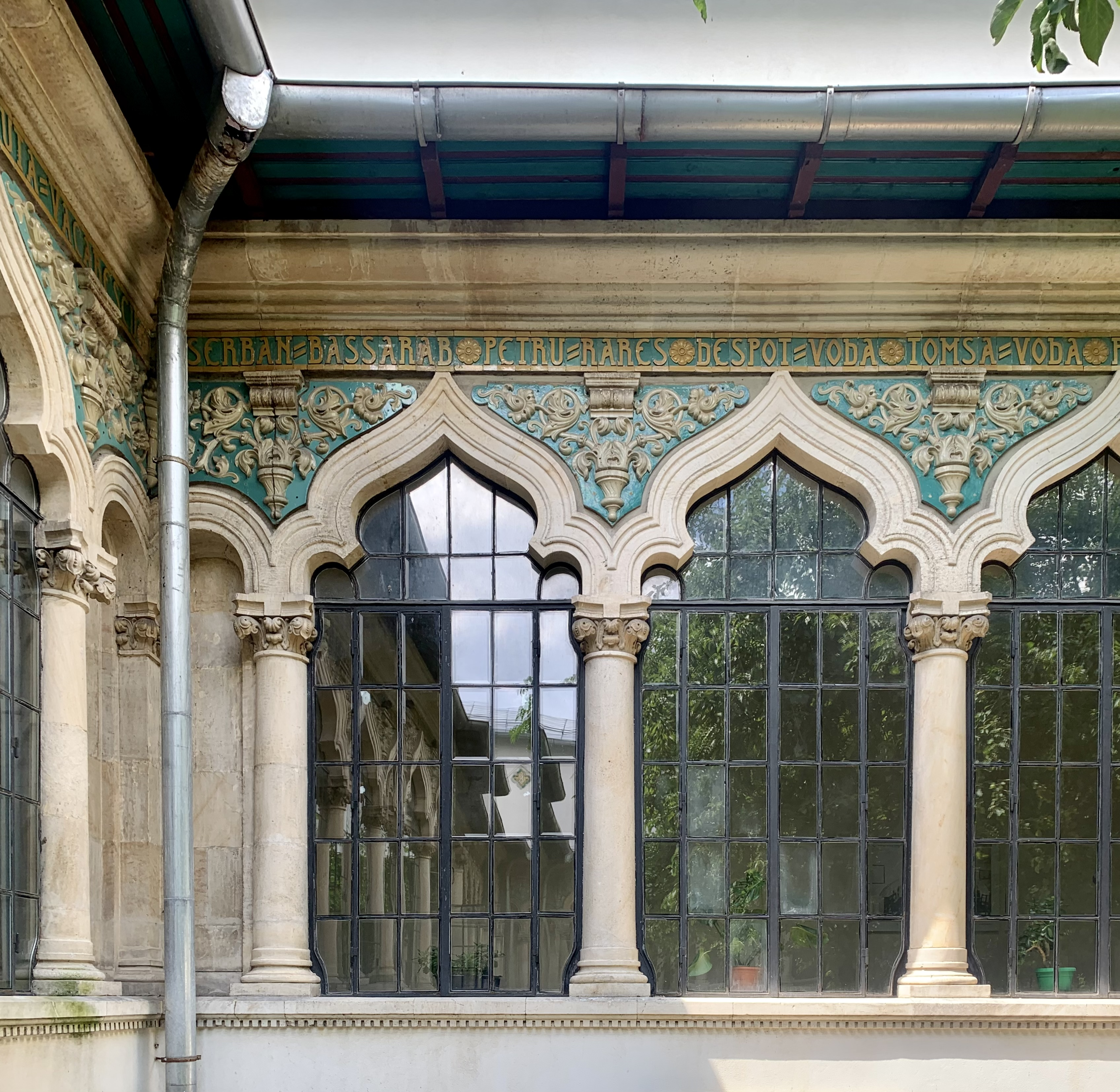
Windows overlooking the inner courtyard

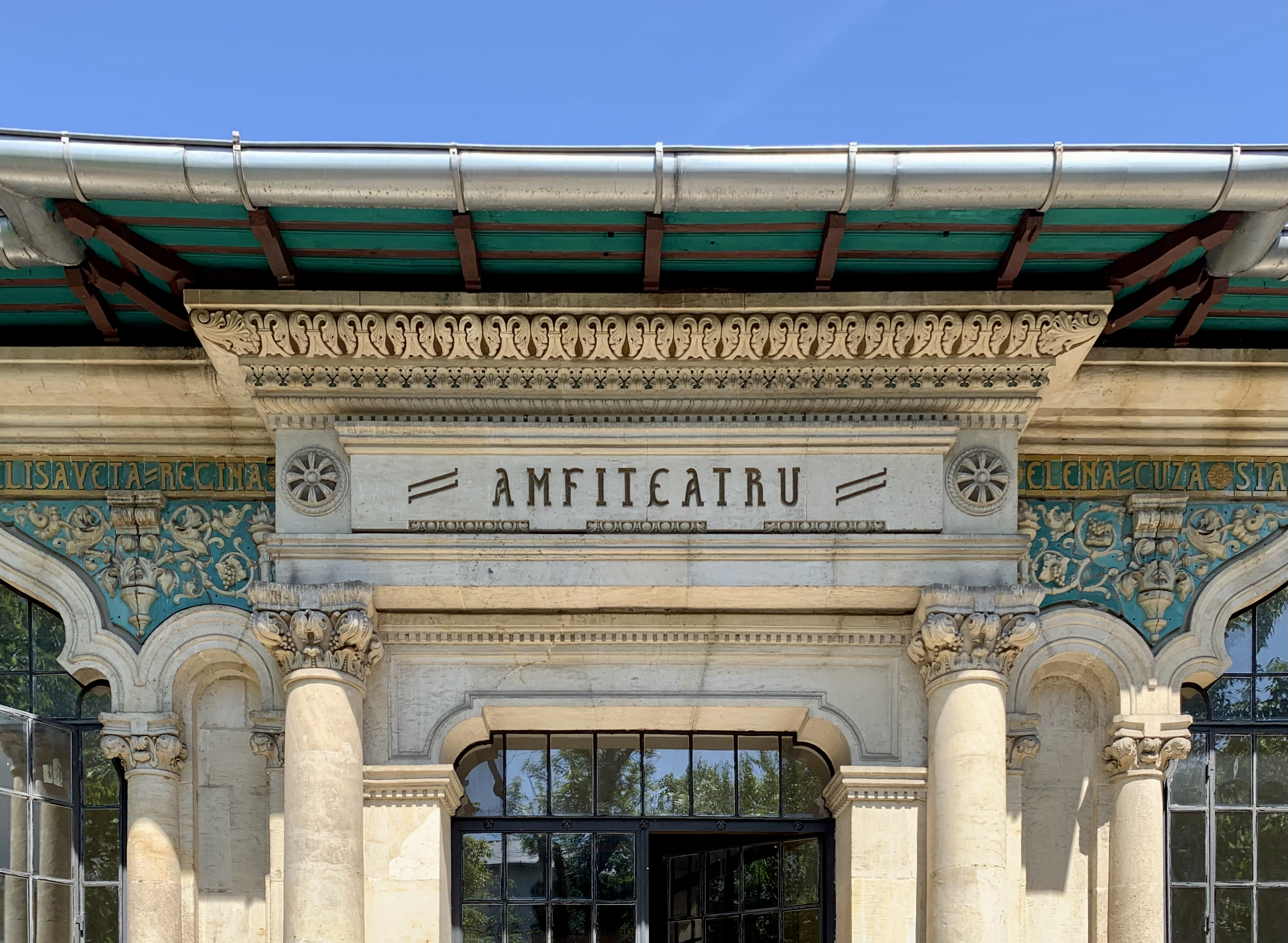
Towards the amphitheater

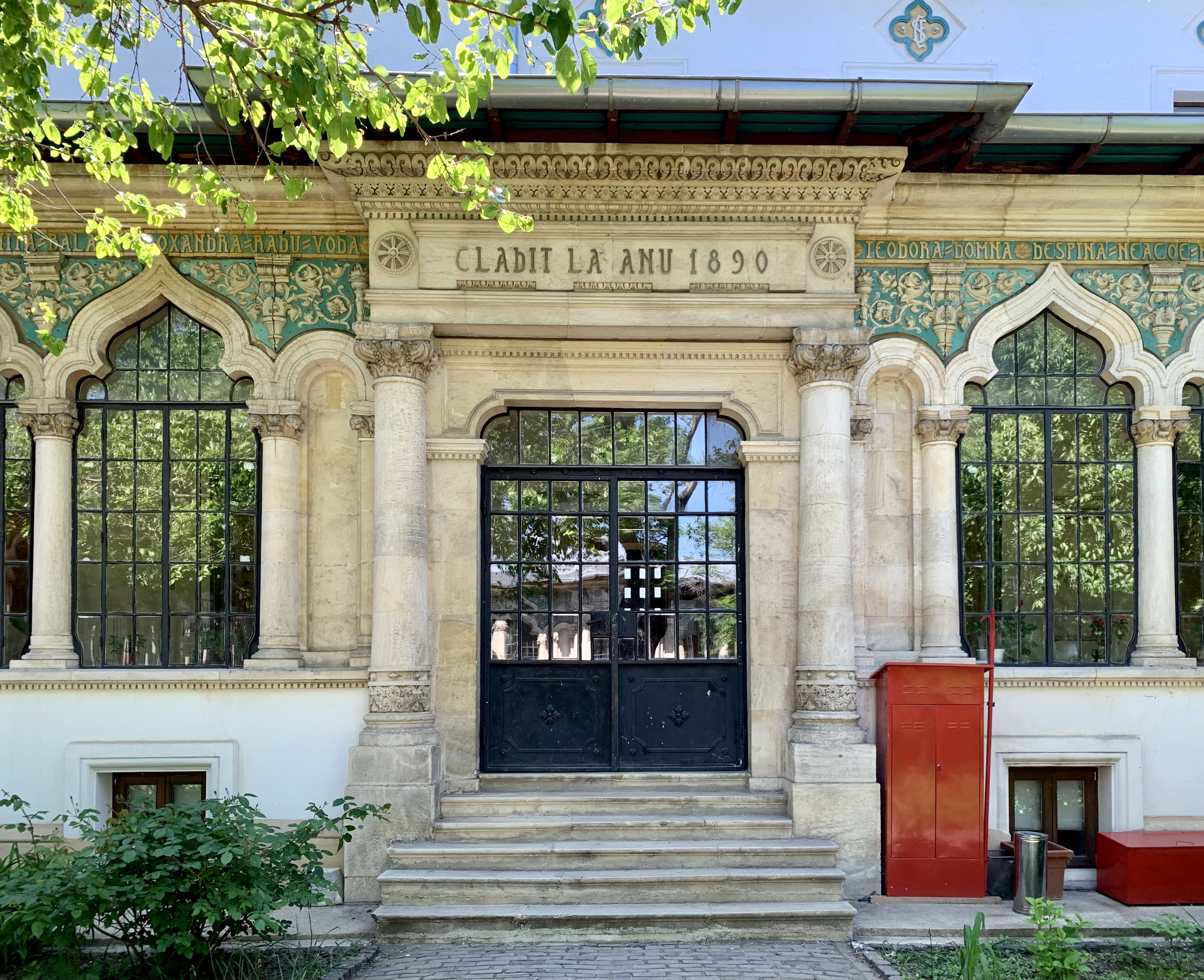
One of the entrances leading to the inner courtyard

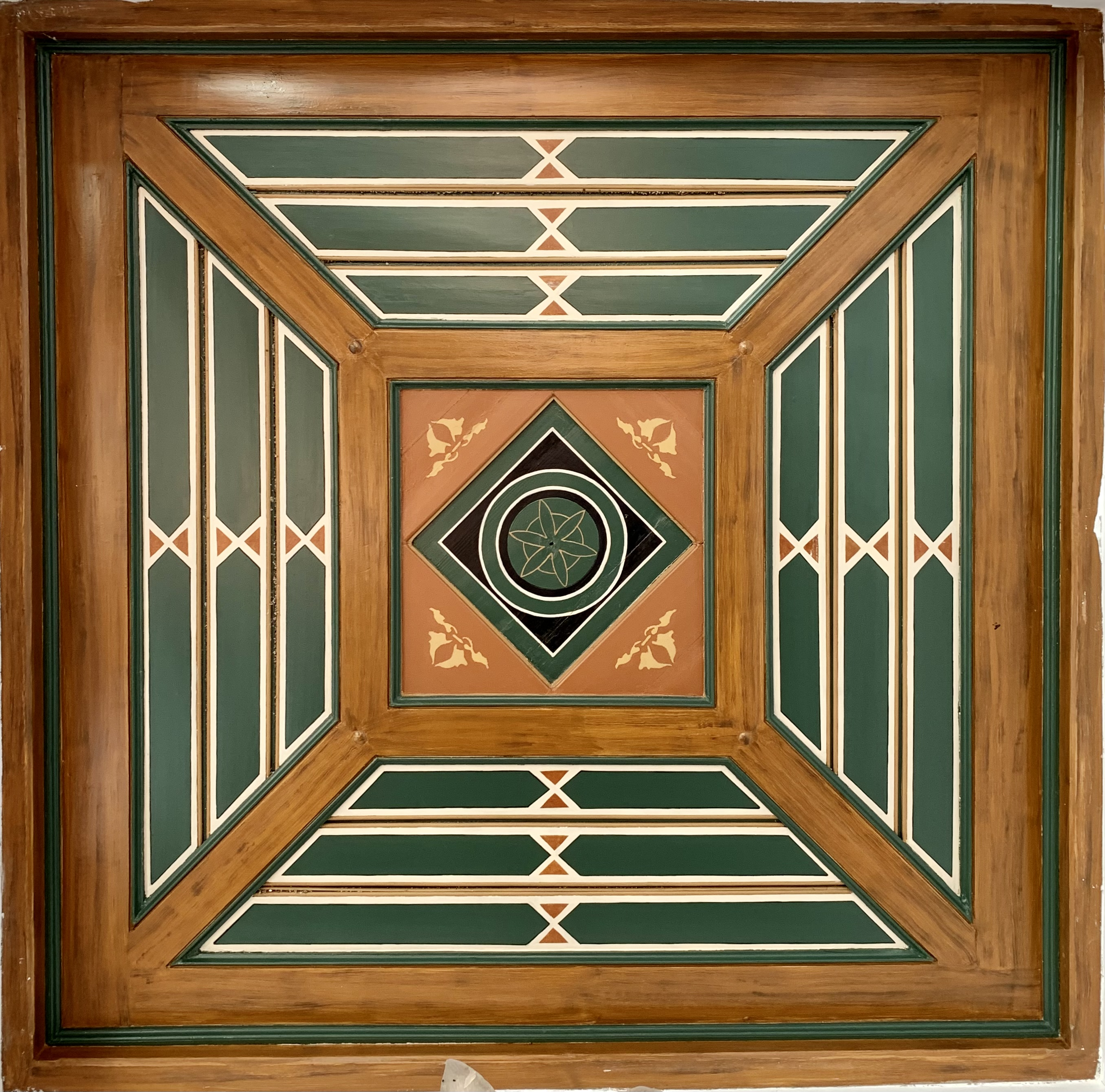
Detail of a ceiling

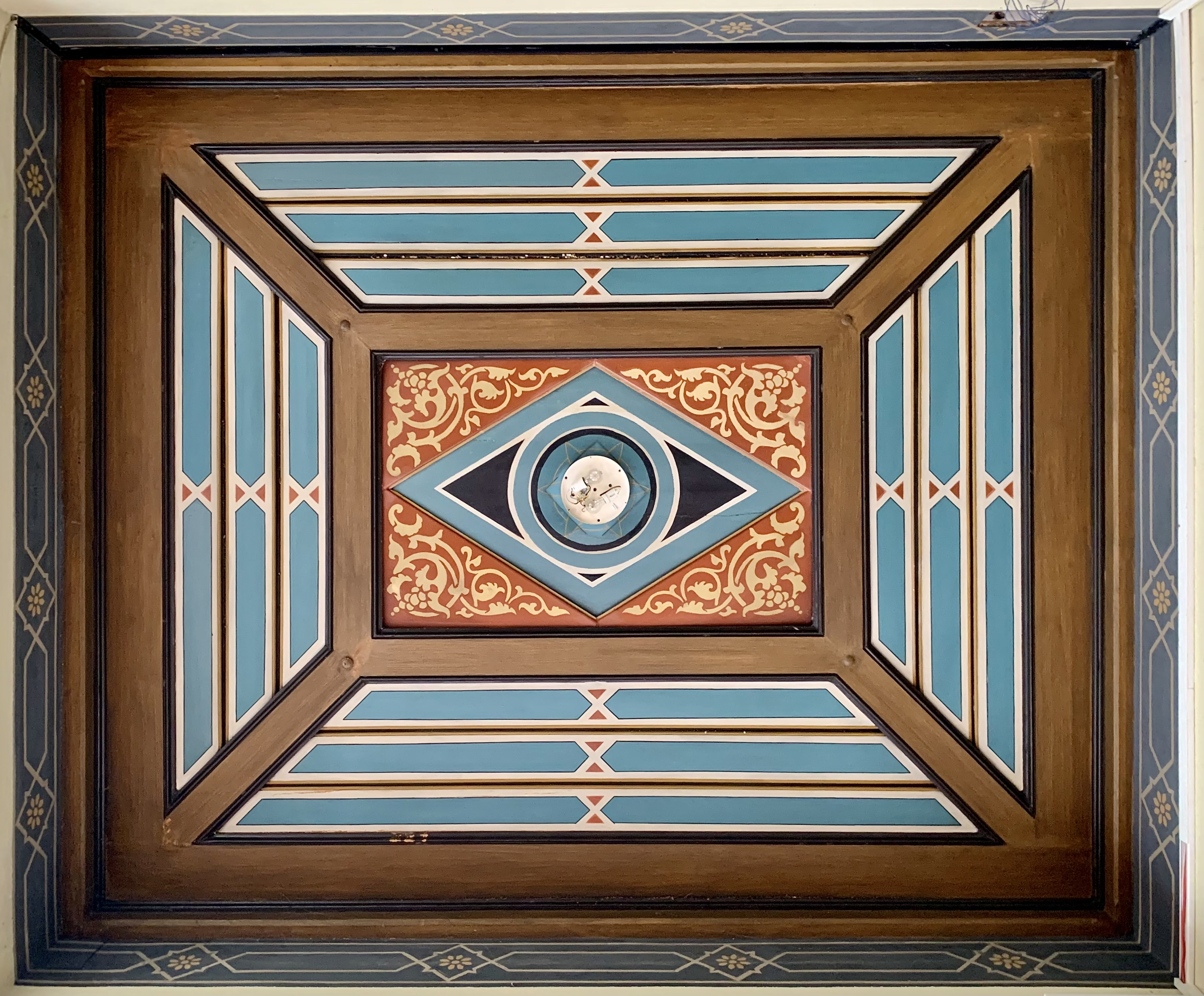
Detail of a ceiling

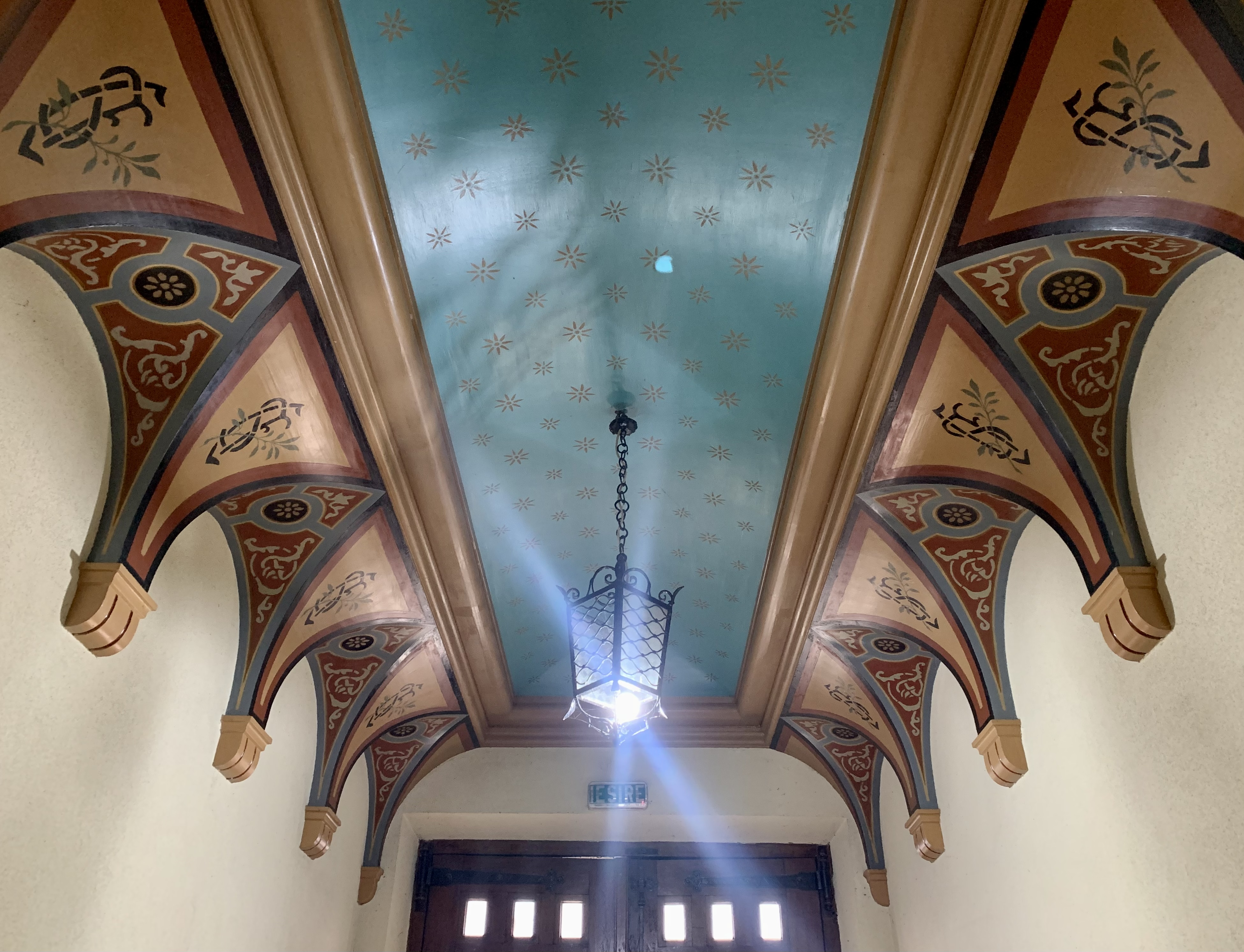
Detail of a ceiling

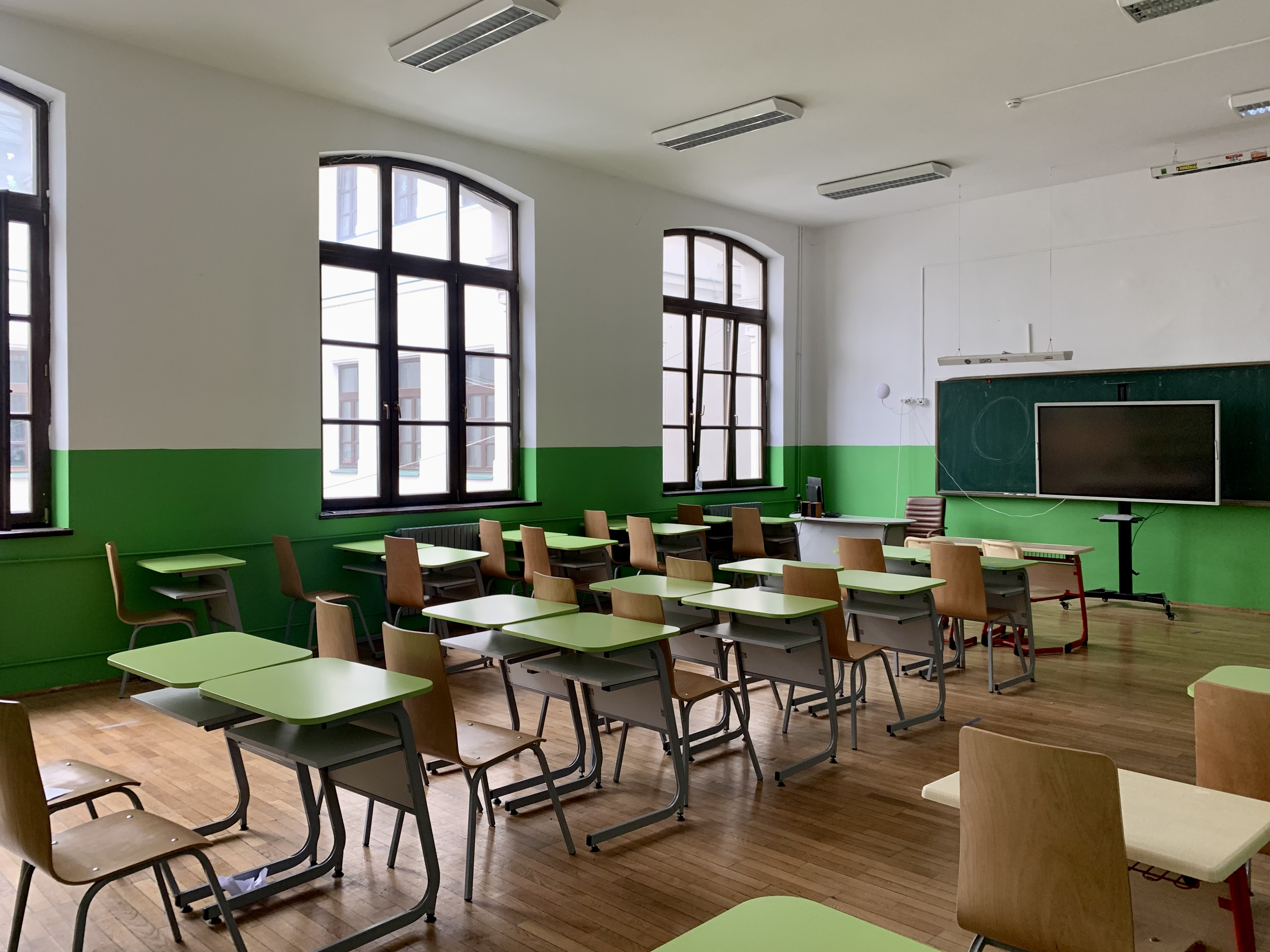
Inside one of the classrooms

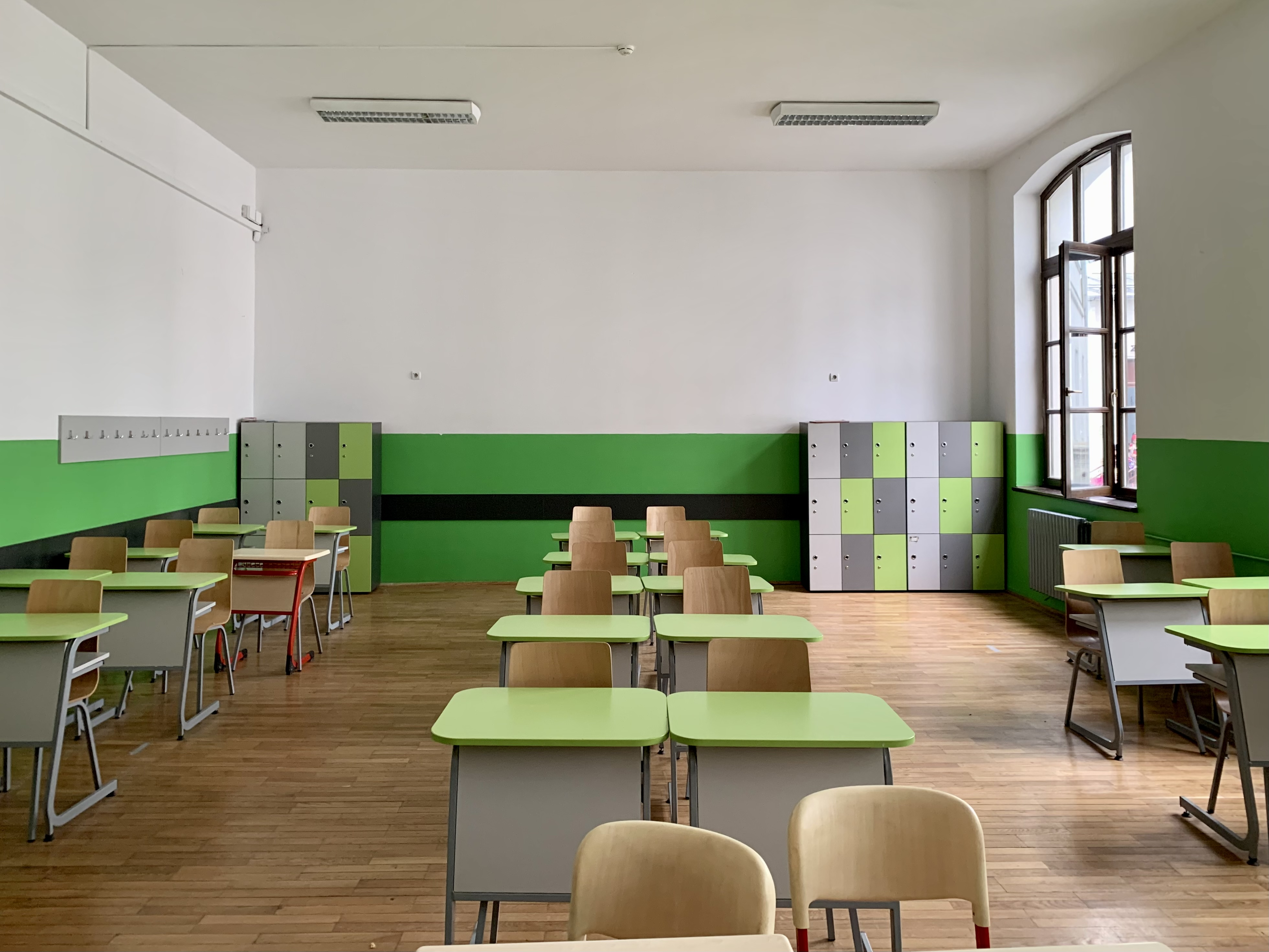
Inside one of the classrooms
