= Zoe Dumitrescu-Bușulenga =

Romanian comparatist and essayist (1920–2006)

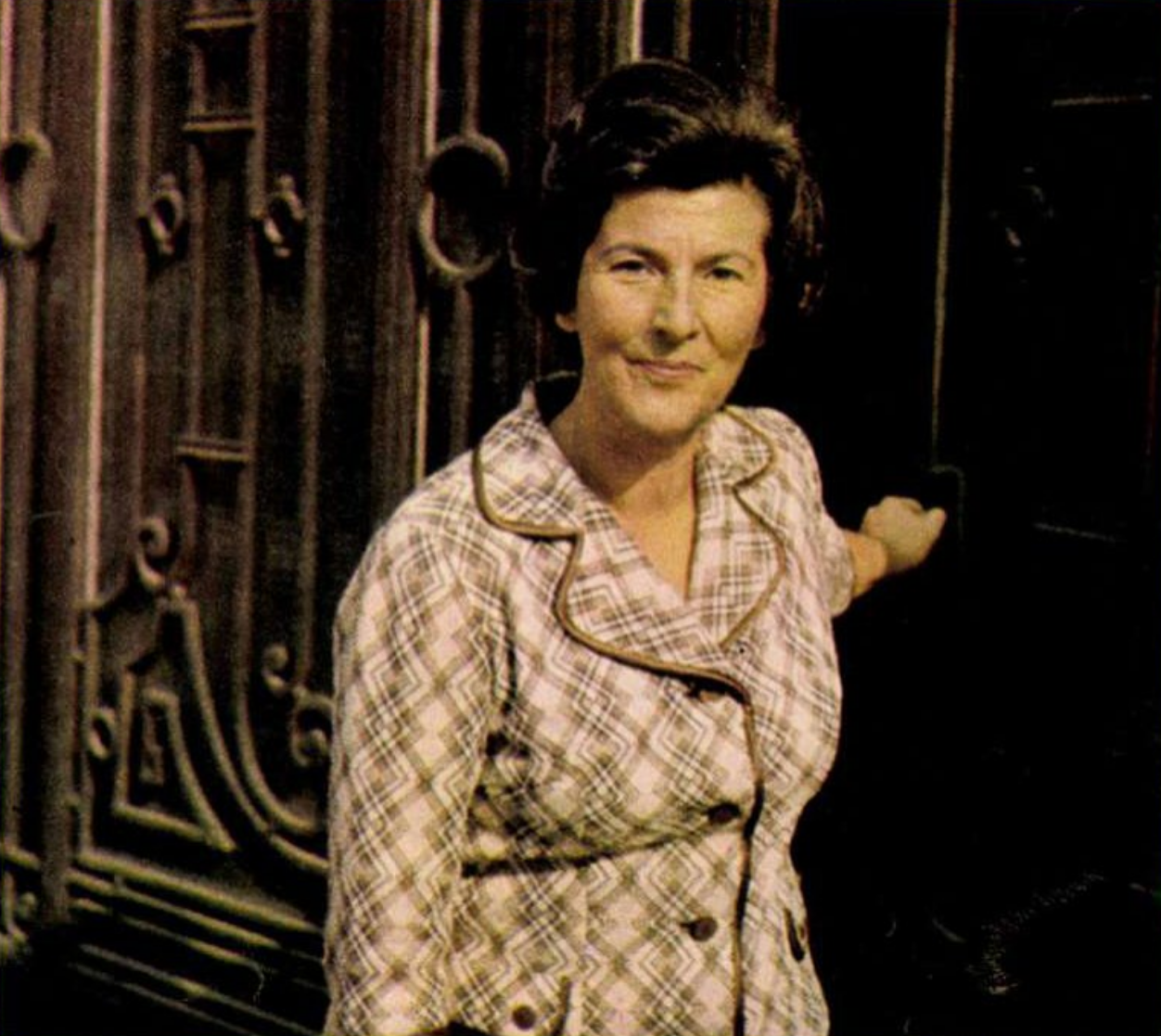
- Dumitrescu-Bușulenga in 1975, photograph by Ion Predoșanu
- Born: August 20, 1920; Bucharest, Romania
- Died: May 5, 2006 (aged 85); Iași, Romania
- Education: University of Bucharest
- Occupations: Comparatist, essayist
- Parents: Nicolae Dumitrescu (father); Maria (Apostol) Dumitrescu (mother)

Zoe Dumitrescu-Bușulenga (August 20, 1920 – May 5, 2006) was a Romanian comparatist and essayist. A native of the national capital Bucharest, she was educated at its main university and went on to become a professor there. Together with a focus on interdisciplinary studies, she devoted several studies to Mihai Eminescu. Dumitrescu was also a dignitary of the Romanian Communist Party. Following the Romanian Revolution, she lived in Rome for several years, then retired to a monastery.

== Biography ==
=== Education and academic career ===
Born in Bucharest, her parents were Nicolae Dumitrescu, a jurist, and his wife Maria (née Apostol). In her native city, she attended primary school (1927–1931) and the Central School for Girls (1931–1939). She was an early lover of music, but unable to pursue a career in the field for medical reasons. Enrolling in the University of Bucharest, she studied law from 1939 to 1943 and literature from 1944 to 1948. She earned a doctorate in 1970. From 1947 to 1948, around the time a communist regime was established in her country, she went to the Soviet Union to attend the Gorky Pedagogical Institute. Dumitrescu worked as an editor at Editura de Stat from 1948 to 1949, and at Editura pentru Literatură until 1957. She was hired as teaching assistant at her alma mater in 1949. She rose to assistant professor in 1951, associate professor in 1963, full professor in 1971 and began chairing the department of universal and comparative literature in 1975. Critic Alex. Ștefănescu, a former student, recalled her courses as being "impressive in their erudition and solemnity, and through a veneration of humanist values visibly at odds with the proletarian egalitarianism promoted by the communist regime".

Having been a researcher there until 1957, she rose to director of the George Călinescu Institute of Literary History and Theory in 1973. She was admitted to the Romanian Writers' Union in 1963. From 1970 to 1982, she served as vice president of the Social and Political Sciences Academy. She was elected a corresponding member of the Romanian Academy in 1974. In 1975, she became president of the Romanian National Committee for Comparative Literature, she was on the executive board of the International Comparative Literature Association from 1973 to 1979, and visiting professor at the University of Amsterdam in 1972. Dumitrescu's rapid ascent in academia drew the ire of Elena Ceaușescu, who eventually decided to halt her progress. She directed two magazines, Synthesis and Revista de istorie și teoria literară. As a comparatist and critic in the Anglo-German mould, her interests included interdisciplinarity and philosophy of culture. Among her books were Renașterea: Umanismul și dialogul artelor (1971), Valori și echivalențe umanistice (1973), Periplu umanistic (1980) and Itinerarii prin cultură (1982). Dumitrescu also initiated and coordinated several syntheses of literary history for the institute she led. The four books she published between 1964 and 1989 closely analyse the works of poet Mihai Eminescu. As a gifted communicator, she spoke before a wide range of audiences: students, in conference halls and on radio and television, emerging as a public intellectual.

=== Political involvement, later years and legacy ===
Dumitrescu joined the Romanian Communist Party in 1966, the year after Nicolae Ceaușescu came to power. She was a member of the party's central committee from August 1969 to November 1974. She served two terms in the Great National Assembly, representing Bucharest districts both times: from 1975 to 1980 and from 1980 to 1985. She was awarded the Order of 23 August, fourth class. This was followed in 1971 by the Cultural Merit Order, second class, and by the special prize of the Writers' Union in 1986 and 1989. She was granted the Order of Cyril and Methodius by the People's Republic of Bulgaria in 1977, and the following year became a commander of the Order of Merit of the Italian Republic. She received the Herder Prize in 1988. In 1990, following the Romanian Revolution, she rose to titular membership of the Romanian Academy. From 1991 to 1997, she headed the Accademia di Romania in Rome.

Late in life, beginning around 2000, she spent most of her time at the Romanian Orthodox Văratec Monastery and ultimately took the vows of a nun, adopting the name Benedicta. She had been introduced to the monastery by Valeria, the widow of writer Mihail Sadoveanu, who invited her to spend summers there. Dumitrescu herself was a widow; she had married at the age of 29, and had no children. She died in Iași and was buried at Putna Monastery. Writing shortly after her death, Ștefănescu claimed that her rapprochement with the regime was motivated by a desire to be left alone, permitted to teach the humanities at home and assert the importance of Romanian culture abroad. He lamented that this stance drew opprobrium in the post-communist period, both from "maniacal vigilantes bereft of a feeling for nuance" and from "poorly educated youths of the sort who deface statues with paint".
