= First Battle of Oituz =

1916 battle between Romania and Austria-Hungary and Germany

- Part of World War I
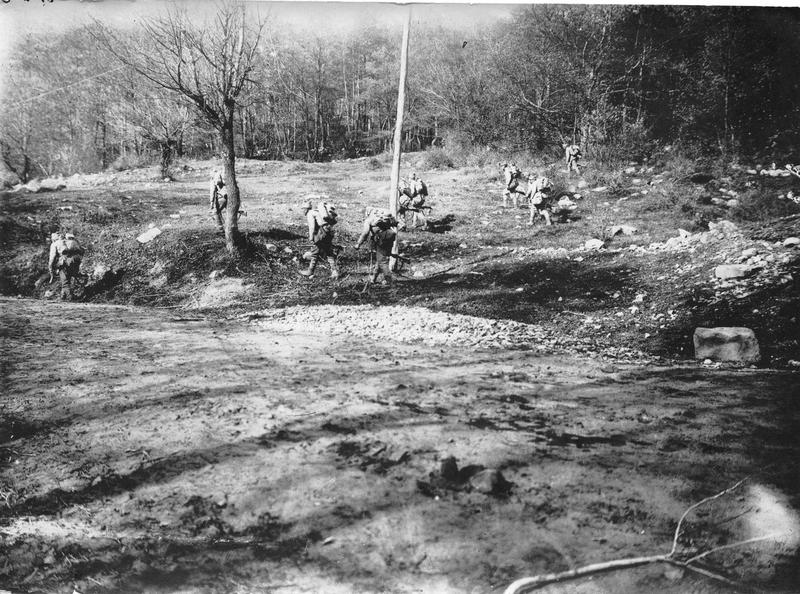
- Romanian soldiers advancing on 23 October 1916
Date	12–27 October 1916
Location	Border of Austria-Hungary and Romania (today in Bacău and Covasna counties, eastern Romania)
Result	Romanian victory

Belligerents
Romania	Austria-Hungary (German Empire) Germany

Commanders and leaders
(Romania) Eremia Grigorescu (Romania) Nicolae Sinescu	(Austria-Hungary) Charles I (German Empire) Erich von Falkenhayn

The First Battle of Oituz was fought between 12 and 27 October 1916 between the Kingdom of Romania on one side and Austria-Hungary and the German Empire on the other. It was part of the Romanian operations for the defense of the passes in the Carpathians. The objectives of the operation were to resist the enemy attack on the Transylvanian front, to obtain and maintain a defensive device in the Carpathian alignment and to create the conditions for an eventual counter-offensive. At the end, the Central Powers (Germany and Austria-Hungary) failed to defeat the Romanian forces and the battle was a victory for the latter.

The Austro-Hungarian forces were commanded by Charles I of Austria, heir to the Austro-Hungarian throne, while the German army was commanded by General Erich von Falkenhayn. On the other hand, the Romanian commanders were Eremia Grigorescu and Nicolae Sinescu.
