= Tribes of Montenegro =

Historical tribes of Montenegro

Historical map of Old Montenegro, with its tribal divisions

The tribes of Montenegro (Montenegrin and Serbian: племена Црне Горе, plemena Crne Gore) or Montenegrin tribes (Montenegrin and Serbian: црногорска племена, crnogorska plemena) are historical tribes in the areas of Old Montenegro, Brda, Old Herzegovina and Primorje.

Most tribes were formed in the 15th and 16th centuries, during and after the Ottoman conquest of the medieval state of Zeta, where they replaced former administrative units known as župas. As a result, the tribal territories also became basic geopolitical units of larger divisions of the Ottoman Empire, such as the Vilayet of Montenegro, the eastern parts of the Sanjak of Herzegovina and parts of the Sanjak of Scutari. From the late 14th century to the 18th century, some tribes were also under the rule of Venetian Albania. In the 18th century, many tribes became part of the Prince-Bishopric of Montenegro and after 1858 most of them were united into the Principality of Montenegro.

The tribal assembly (zbor) of the Principality of Montenegro was initially officially composed of the two communities of Old Montenegro (Crnogorci i.e. “Montenegrin”) and the Brda (Brđani i.e. “Highlanders”). However, in anthropological and historical studies, the tribes are divided into those of Old Montenegro, Brda, Old Herzegovina and Primorje, then into sub-groups (bratstva i.e. “brotherhoods” or “clans”) and finally into families. Today they are mainly studied within the frameworks of social anthropology and family history, as they have not been used in official structures since the time of the Principality of Montenegro, although some tribal regions overlap with contemporary municipal areas. The kinship groups give a sense of shared identity and descent.

== Origin ==
The origins of the tribal system in Montenegro and Herzegovina are unclear and throughout the 20th century, the matter has been the subject of many debates and controversies in former Yugoslavia. In fact, the question has given rise to two rival theories that can be grouped into two schools of thought, the ethnographic and the historical.

=== The ethnographic school ===
Also called the anthropogeographical theory, it was developed by Jovan Cvijić at the beginning of the 20th century, summarized by his student Jovan Erdeljanović and, later, further expanded by the Serbian anthropologist Petar Šobajić. This theory suggests that the origins of the tribes in Montenegro, as well as those of Herzegovina and Northern Albania, date back well before the establishment of the medieval South Slavic states. While its proponents acknowledge the possibility that some tribes may have originated in the 15th century, they argue that the majority of them, such as the Cuce or Ćeklići, actually emerged much earlier. These tribes are believed to have developed from ancient Balkan populations predating the Slavic era, including Vlachs or Albanians, who are thought to have been gradually Slavicized over time. These old tribes would have disappeared for the most part with the advent of the feudal state and then re-emerged in the 15th century, within the context of the collapse of the state structures which followed the Ottoman conquest. One of the key aspects highlighted by the ethnographic school also concerns the relationships between members of a tribe. While these generally tend to consider that they share a common patrilineal ancestor, Cvijić and his successors proposed a different view, suggesting that this may not be the case. In their opinion, tribes did not form on the basis of kinship but rather as a result of the amalgamation of various clans of different origin. On a territorial basis, the smaller clans would have gathered around the strongest, who would then have given his patronymic name to the newly-formed tribe.

=== The historical school ===
However, the ethnographic school emerged after the establishment of its counterpart, the historical school, by Konstantin Jireček, in the second half of the 19th century. In his book Vlachs and Morlachs in Ragusan Sources, published in 1879, the Czech historian considers that the modern Montenegrin tribes only appeared in the second half of the 15th century as the outgrowth of Vlach katuns. This theory was then taken up and developed by Milan Šufflay and, in the second half of the 20th century, by Vaso Čubrilović and Branislav Djurdjev. One of the key points of the historical school is that the tribal organization of Montenegro developed after the collapse of the Crnojevići's Zetan state. After the Ottoman conquest, the medieval župas, heart of the territorial organization of the feudal Nemanjić state and its successors, were replaced with administrative units called nahiyas. Nevertheless, the tribes of Old Montenegro, Brda, and Old Herzegovina would not have originated from feudal nahiyas but rather from katuns and Vlachs. In fact, while the names of numerous Montenegrin tribes are already mentioned in records from the 14th and 15th centuries as names of katuns, such as the Banjani, Drobnjaci, Ćeklići, Malonšići, Pješivci or Bjelopavlići, some are not explicitly identified as katuns. Instead, they are called Vlachs, such as the Bjelice or the Nikšići. The katun was primarily a kinship organization, but since the Vlach shepherds were also serving as soldiers, it was also a military organization. Thus, the župas would have been divided by the katuns in areas where the katuns became tribes. In this case, whether through kinship, i.e., by bringing together unrelated people in an allegedly blood-related core group, or by uniting families without imposing a blood union, the Vlach katuns would have introduced elements of their kinship structure and military democracy into the tribes that arose on the ruins of the feudal territorial organization. In fact, Djurdjev was quite categorical regarding the fact that the origins of the kinship sense of affiliation in the tribes can only be traced back to the organization introduced by the katun.

=== Other views ===
Outside Yugoslavia and the nations that emerged from it, few studies have been devoted to the Montenegrin tribes. The American anthropologist Christopher Boehm, who had studied them extensively, believed that only a few of them are descended from the ancient pre-Slavic population of the Western Balkans, namely the Illyrians. According to him, the vast majority of clans are descended from Slavs who settled in the Balkans before the 10th century, with a few clan names remaining from the Illyrian heritage. He also believed that most of the tribes were formed by more recently immigrated Serbian clans, patrilineal kinship groups founded by men who had fled to Montenegro from adjacent Serbian regions for political reasons, namely to escape blood feuds or problems with the local Ottoman overlords.

== Organization ==
The tribes (plemena, sing. pleme) were territorial and socio-political units composed of clans (bratstva, sing. bratstvo) in historical Montenegro. The tribes are not necessarily kin as they only serve as a geopolitical unit. The tribes enjoyed especially large autonomy in the period from the second part of the 15th century until the mid-19th century. Initially they were recorded as katuns - a basic Albanian/Vlach social and ethnic structure not always homogeneous by blood on which head was katunar - tribal chief. With Slavicization, former katuns began to be called plemena (meaning both tribe and clan), while the katunar became Slavic vojvoda or knez. Following the Ottoman occupation, the relative isolation from one another and lack of centralized authority made them local self-governing units.

The clans or brotherhoods (bratstvo) are made of patrilocal kin groups (rodovi, sing. rod) which usually trace their origin to a particular male ancestor and share the same surname. Names of brotherhoods are derived from either names, nicknames or profession of the ancestor. The bratstvo is an exogamous group and in most cases, marriage within the bratstvo is forbidden regardless of the biological distance between the would-be spouses. However, this is not the case with some larger brotherhoods who sometimes allow endogamous marriages if the genealogical distance between spouses is large enough. In war, the members of the bratstvo (bratstvenici) were obliged to stand together. The size of such units varied in size, ranging from 50 to 800 warriors (1893). Through time the bratstvo would split into smaller subdivisions and acquire separate names. Contemporary surnames of Montenegrins usually come from these smaller units. The members tend to guard their family history and many are able to recite the line of ancestors to the originator of the bratstvo.

A tribe is commonly made up of several brotherhoods of different ancestry. At times of tribal autonomy, brotherhoods usually lived concentrated in the same place for long time and therefore formed a part of the tribe. Different brotherhoods living on the territory of one tribe were often not related to each other. A new brotherhood could be established (and often was) if a stranger sought refuge, usually because of conflict with Ottoman authorities or because of a blood feud, within a tribe.

The tribes were an important institution in Montenegro throughout its modern history and state creation. Every tribe had its chief, and they collectively composed a "gathering" or assembly (zbor or skupština). The tribal assembly elected the vladika (bishop-ruler) from exemplary families, who from the 15th century were the main figures in resistance to Ottoman incursions. The uniting of tribes (and mitigating blood feuds) was their core objective, but the results were limited to narrow cohesion and solidarity.

== Culture ==
The Dinaric society of highland herdsmen had a patriarchal-heroic culture with endemic culture of violence caused by the survival from poverty on barren terrain, isolation from cities and education, and preservation of tribal structures. Illiteracy was not uncommon, and folk songs had higher influence on moral standards compared to Orthodox religious teaching. Sharp father-son clashes were common as violent self-assertion brought respect. Danilo Medaković in 1860 noted the paradox in Dinaric men "He is as courageous in combat as he is fearful of harsh authorities. Harsh authorities can turn him into a true slave", resulting in willingness to fight, but never true political freedom. Guerrilla warfare also had a negative impact on respect of the laws, with robbery and looting making important part of economical income. The harsh Montenegric life perspective is reflected in The Mountain Wreath (1847).

The clans were often in intertribal conflicts and blood feuds (krvna osveta). Collaborating with external enemy (Ottomans, Austrians) against domestic wasn't uncommon, as Milovan Djilas relates "We Montenegrins did not hold a grudge against the enemy alone, but against one another as well". Djilas in his boyhood memoirs described the blood feuds and resulting vengeance as "was the debt we paid for the love and sacrifice our forebears and fellow clansmen bore for us. It was the defence of our honour and good name, and the guarantee of our maidens. It was our pride before others; our blood was not water that anyone could spill... It was centuries of manly pride and heroism, survival, a mother's milk and a sister's vow, bereaved parents and children in black, joy, and songs turned into silence and wailing. It was all, all". Although it made life miserable, "threat of vendetta helped to hold individuals within marriage pattern... individual tribes remained viable as political units under the vendetta system because truces usually could be made when needed".

In modern censuses of Montenegro, descendants identify as Montenegrins, Serbs, ethnic Muslims and Bosniaks, and Albanians.

The organisational structure varies significantly between various clans and tribes. Traditionally, the Vojvoda was regarded as the highest authority in the tribe. However, the appointment on such position also diverged among clans and evolved in the process of time. In some tribes the position was hereditary, and not necessarily from father to son, while in some was elective. Tribes of Old Montenegro rarely had Voivodas until the 18th century. The authority was thus in the hand of the local knez (similar to the Anglo-Saxon Esquire). The Highland tribes appointed Voivodas since the mid 15th century, while the tribes of the Old Herzegovina started the practice a century later. Voivoda had the authority to represent the tribe overall and thus his allegiances, either to the Ottomans or to the Prince-Bishops of Montenegro, even proclaiming himself independent marked the political course of the tribe. With the stronger central authority, Voivodes were gradually recognised as a sort of nobility in Montenegro, with the ruler having a power to strip them off the title. This historical process laid foundation for the creation of modern Montenegro, which evolved to the country from a loose federation of the tribes in the 18/19th turn of the century. The title of knez gradually disappeared, and thus was replaced with Sardar (similar to Count, but below Voivoda). During the period of theocracy, the highest religious authority was reserved for the Hegumen of some of the medieval monasteries which tribe claimed as its own and for whom it developed a worshiping cult. Morača is a particular example since it served as a gathering place of both Rovčani and Moračani tribe and, up to the beginning of the 19th century, Vasojevići, who later developed their own cult after Đurđevi Stupovi.

== History ==
=== Background ===
Each tribe has a complex historical and geographical origin. During the Middle Ages the Slavic population managed to culturally assimilate the native Romanized descendants of "Illyrian" tribes. Tribal names (including a few non-Slavic) left traces in the toponymy of Montenegro and surrounding countries. As far as historical records by age and testimony go, it is shown that at least between 14th and 15th century many tribal migrations to Montenegro from Kosovo, Albania, Bosnia and Herzegovina took place.

=== Early modern period ===
In 1596, an uprising broke out in Bjelopavlići, then spread to Drobnjaci, Nikšić, Piva and Gacko (see Serb Uprising of 1596–97). It was suppressed due to lack of foreign support.

In 1689, an uprising broke out in Piperi, Rovca, Bjelopavlići, Bratonožići, Kuči and Vasojevići, while at the same time an uprising broke out in Prizren, Pejë, Pristina and Skopje, and then in Kratovo and Kriva Palanka in October (Karposh's Rebellion).

In 1697, with the election of the Danilo I Šćepčević from the Njeguši tribe as the metropolitan (vladika) of Cetinje, succession became restricted to the Petrović clan until 1918 (with exception of short periods of rule by Šćepan Mali and Arsenije Plamenac). As Orthodox bishops could not have children, the official title was passed from uncle to nephew. Danilo I established Montenegro's first code of law, a court to arbitrate the legal matter, and struggled to unite the tribes.

For most of the 18th century, the tribes of Old Montenegro were divided, being regularly pitted against each other by blood feuds and other grievances. And when they cooperated, it was mostly in their own interests. As a result, the local government in Cetinje was unable to centralize authority and had great difficulties to collect taxes from the tribal leaders. Despite several attempts by the vladikas to end it, tribes continued the tradition of feuding and remained divided, resulting in a weak central government that had the effect of making Montenegro backward and also vulnerable against the Ottomans. However, this partially ended with the advent of the false tsar, Šćepan Mali (“Stephen the Small”). A mysterious man of unknown origin, he pretented to be the defunct Russian emperor Peter III and managed to get himself elected as the leader of Montenegro by the assembly of tribal chefs (Serbian: zbor), in 1767. The news of Šćepan's election was enthusiastically received by the Brda tribes and, more generally, all the tribesmen had such faith in their new leader that Venice failed to shake his rule. Relying on his charismatic qualities, Šćepan was the first to give Montenegro a form of central authority, managing to suppress the blood feud which had ravaged the tribes and instigating a system of justice in its place. Although harsh and sometimes cruel, Šćepan was able to impose a kind of social order on a tribal society that was rather primitive compared to the rest of Europe.

However, Šćepan Mali was murdered in August 1773 and a year later, in the same month, Mehmed Pasha Bushati attacked the Kuči and Bjelopavlići, but was decisively defeated with the help of the Montenegrins, after which the vizier and his Albanian troops withdrew to Scutari.

The brief period of civil order brought by Šćepan's reign did not overpower the tribal norms that prevailed in Montenegrin society. However, the false tsar had laid the foundations that would lead the tribes to unite, under the rule of Petar I Petrović and his successors. Petar I came to power in 1784 and, after several appeals (Serbian: poslanice) to the tribal chiefs, managed to successfully unite the tribes of Old Montenegro against the Ottomans at the Assembly of Cetinje, in 1787. In the same year, Montenegro began to attract the attention of Russia and Austria, who were seeking the support of the Balkan Christians against the Ottoman Empire. In 1789, Jovan Radonjić, the governor of Montenegro, wrote for the second time to the Russian empress, Catherine II: Now, all of us Serbs from Montenegro, Herzegovina, Banjani, Drobnjaci, Kuči, Piperi, Bjelopavlići, Zeta, Klimenti, Vasojevići, Bratonožići, Pejë, Kosovo, Prizren, Albania, Macedonia belong to your Excellency and pray that you, as our kind mother, send over Prince Sofronije Jugović-Marković. In the following years, Catherine and the Habsburg Emperor Joseph II offered financial support, military advisors and volunteers to bolster the Montenegrin war effort against the Ottomans.

On July 11, 1796, the Montenegrins inflicted a crucial defeat on the Ottomans at the battle of Martinići. A few months later, an assembly of tribal leaders gathered in Cetinje and swore an oath to the unity of Montenegro, called the Stega (“fastening”), with the aim of uniting the tribes of Old Montenegro and the Brda. This act was adopted on the eve of the battle of Krusi, on 4 October 1796, where the Montenegrins defeated the Ottoman army of Kara Mahmud Pasha, who was killed during the confrontation. Following the battle, Montenegro gained part of the territory of the Brda, north-east of Cetinje, except for tribal areas of the Rovčani, Moračani and Vasojevići.

=== 19th century ===
After the First Serbian Uprising broke out (1804), smaller uprisings also broke out in Drobnjaci (1805), Rovca and Morača.

Prince-Bishop Petar I (r. 1782-1830) sought the help of Russia in 1807 to create a new Serbian Empire centred on Montenegro. He waged a successful campaign against the bey of Bosnia in 1819; the repulse of an Ottoman invasion from Albania during the Russo-Turkish War led to the recognition of Montenegrin sovereignty over Piperi. Petar I had managed to unite the Piperi, Kuči and Bjelopavlići into his state. A civil war broke out in 1847, in which the Piperi and Crmnica sought to secede from the principality which was afflicted by a famine, and could not relieve them with the rations of the Ottomans, the secessionists were subdued and their ringleaders shot. Amid the Crimean War, there was a political problem in Montenegro; Danilo I's uncle, George, urged for yet another war against the Ottomans, but the Austrians advised Danilo not to take arms. A conspiracy was formed against Danilo, led by his uncles George and Pero, the situation came to its height when the Ottomans stationed troops along the Herzegovinian frontier, provoking the mountaineers. Some urged an attack on Bar, others raided into Herzegovina, and the discontent of Danilo's subjects grew so much that the Piperi, Kuči and Bjelopavlići, the recent and still unamalgamated acquisitions, proclaimed themselves an independent state in July, 1854. Danilo was forced to take measurement against the rebels in Brda, some crossed into Turkish territory and some submitted and were to pay for the civil war they had caused.

Petar II Petrović-Njegoš further united Montenegrin tribes, forging structure of the state, and Montenegro independence in 1878, as well solidarity with Serbia and Serbdom. Croatian historian Ivo Banac claims that with Serbian Orthodox religious and cultural influence, Montenegrins had lost sight of their complex origin and thought of themselves as Serbs. Like at the time of Danilo I, was advocated physical persecution of Muslim population, also making part of religious definition of Montenegrin identity.

=== 20th century ===
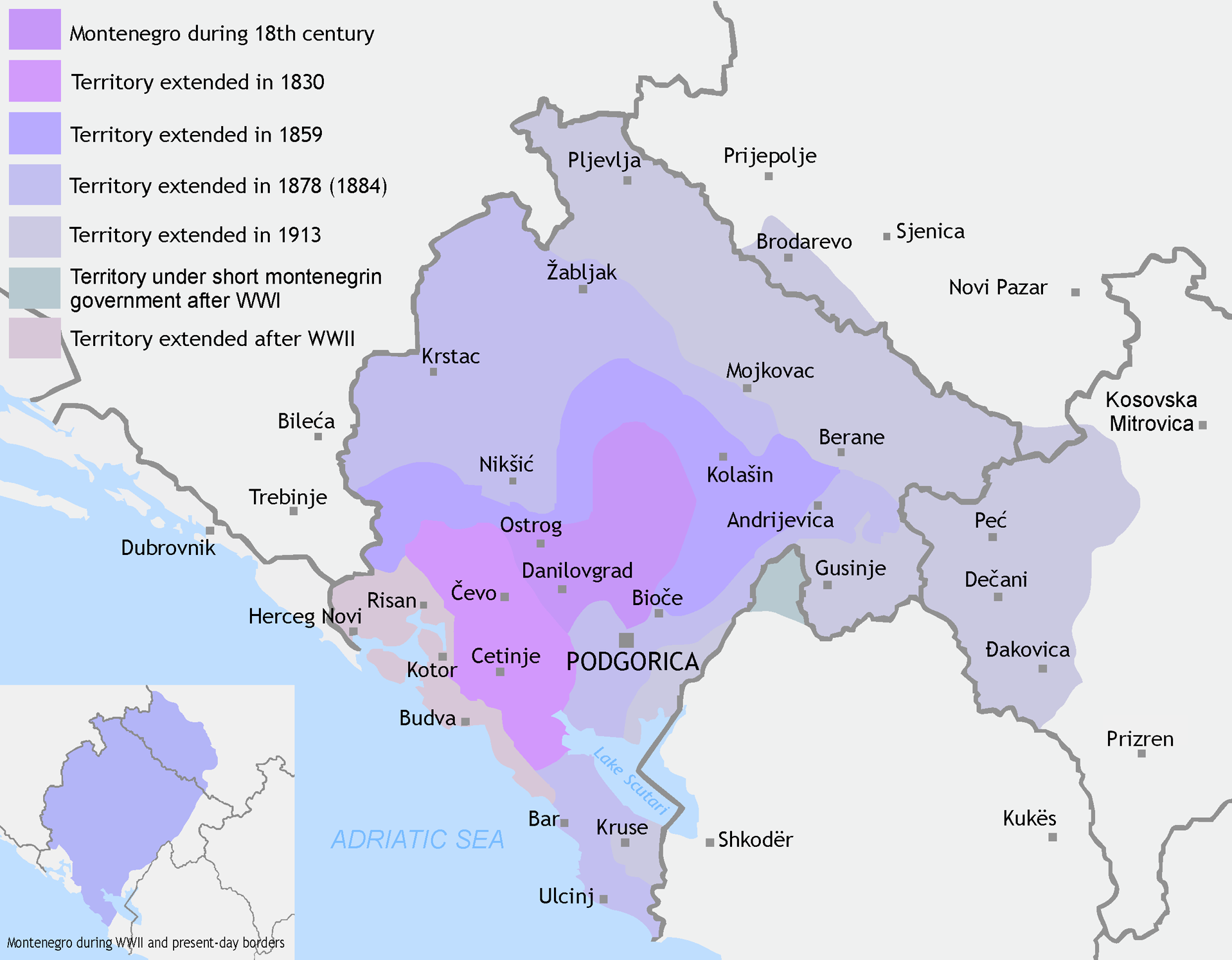
Expansion of Montenegro (1830–1944).

In 1904 Nikola I Petrović-Njegoš reorganized the Principality of Montenegro into "captaincies", each organized on a tribal level. Every nahija had its own elder (from the corresponding tribe). The tribal assemblies were attended regularly by all grown men from the corresponding clan. The "General Montenegrin Assembly" was the highest political body and a mediator between the Montenegrin people and the Ottoman authorities. It was composed of chiefs of all tribes in Montenegro.

The territorial expansion of Montenegro continued, and after the Balkan Wars (1912–13), it included substantial parts of Herzegovina, Serbia and Albania. Since 1880 the ambitions of Nikola I collided with those of Obrenović and Karađorđević dynasty for leadership of the Serbs. Montenegrin nationalism (federalism) eventually suffered from the political activity of young Montenegrins living in Serbia. During the Podgorica Assembly (1918) which decided the fate of Montenegro as either an independent state (supported by the Greens) or a united part of the Kingdom of Serbia (supported by the Whites), the tribes were divided, even internally. The Greens consisted of the highland tribes of Moračani, Piperi and Rovči, the Katun clans of Bjelice, Cetinje, Cveto and Cuce and the Hercegovinian tribes of Nikšići and Rudinjani. The Greens ethnically declared themselves as Serbs, but did not support, what they saw, as a Serbian annexation of the Montenegrin state. However, the Whites supported by the rest of the tribes eventually won.

During World War II, the tribes were internally mainly divided between the two sides of Chetniks (Serbian royalists) and Yugoslav Partisans (communists), that were fighting each other for the rule of Yugoslavia. As a result, the conflict spread within the tribal and clan structures.

== Anthropology ==
Croatian historian Milan Šufflay (1925–1927) considered that the Vlach-Albanian-Montenegrin symbiosis is seen in the etymology of the names, in Piperi, Moguši, Kuči, and the surnames with suffix "-ul" (Gradul, Radul, Serbul, Vladul), and toponymical names of mountains, Durmitor and Visitor. Serbian historian Vladislav Škarić (1918) considered that many brotherhood names, like Sarapi, Radomani and others in Montenegro, belonged to migrants from central Albania, while Bukumiri from Bratonožići, Vajmeši from Vasojevići, Ibalji from Herzegovina came from northern Albania. Serbian ethnologist Jovan Cvijić (1922) noted the Slavic assimilation and migration of many Albanian groups of Mataruge, Macure, Mugoši, Kriči, Španji, Ćići and other Albanians/Vlachs who were mentioned as brotherhoods or tribes. He considered that all gornji ("upper") tribes lived in the parts of currently Serb tribes in Brda and Old Herzegovina, and that many groups were assimilated into the tribes of Piperi, Kuči, Bratonožići, Bjelopavlići among others, who preserved their old name.

Jovan Erdeljanović spoke of the amalgamation of Serbs (Slavs) and Vlachs, and noted that in the older phase of forming of Dinaric tribes, the Serb and Serbicized native brotherhoods united into a tribal unit under one name. Montenegrin ethnologist Petar Šobajić stated that the first Slavic settlers in the area of Zeta mixed with local Romanized Illyrian natives and Slavicized them, though accepting the natives' tribal names (Španje, Mataguži, Mataruge, Malonšići, Macure, Bukumiri, Kriči). Later Serb settlers entered into conflicts with these early mixed tribes, which eventually resulted in the latter's annihilation, and new stronger tribes were formed.

The Serbian anthropologist Petar Vlahović argued that the Slavs that had settled by the 7th century came into contact with the remnants of Romans (Vlachs), who later became a component part of all the Balkan peoples. According to Vlahović, although the old Balkan population retained particularities for a long time, these did not have so much influence on the Slavic tribal communities. Part of the old Balkan population that viewed themselves as Roman inheritors withdrew ahead of the Slavs from the interior to the littoral cities. Meanwhile, the Romans (Vlachs) who stayed in the mountains of the interior became subjects of the Slavs. As such, Vlahović considers that these mountain Vlachs, in terms of their numbers or culture, did not have noticeable effect on the development of society, let alone on the formation of a special ethnos.

== Tribes ==
Tribes of Old Montenegro.

Serbian geographer Jovan Cvijić listed 21 tribes in the territory of Old Montenegro, 7 in Brda (the Highlands), 16 in Old Herzegovina and 2 in Primorje (Montenegrin Littoral). They were divided into two distinct groups; Old Montenegrin, and the tribes in the Highlands. The latter were concentrated in the northeast of Zeta river, and predominantly consisted of tribes who fled Ottoman occupation, and got incorporated into Montenegro following the battles at Martinići and Krusi (1796).

The Old Montenegrin tribes were organized into five (later four) territorial units called nahija (term borrowed from Ottoman nahiye); Katunska, Lješanska, Pješivci (later incorporated into Katunska), Rijeka, and Crmnička nahija.

=== Dispersed brotherhoods ===
There are also large dispersed or emigrant brotherhoods, such as Maleševci, Pavkovići, Prijedojevići, Trebješani (Nikšići), Miloradovići-Hrabreni, Ugrenovići, Bobani, Pilatovci, Mrđenovići and Veljovići.

== Annotations ==
1. The four main regional and historiographical units are known as:
  - Stara Crna Gora ("Old Montenegro"), or simply Crna Gora. Tribes are known as crnogorska plemena. The population is known by the demonym Crnogorci.
  - Brda ("Highlands, Hills"), or Sedmoro brda ("Seven hills"). Tribes are known as brdska- or brđanska plemena. The population is known by the demonym Brđani.
  - Stara Hercegovina ("Old Herzegovina"), or simply Hercegovina. Tribes are known as starohercegovačka- or hercegovačka plemena. The population is known by the demonym Hercegovci.
  - Primorje ("Littoral"). Tribes are known as primorska plemena. The population is known by the demonym Primorci.

== See also ==
- Regions in Montenegro, contains a list of tribal and historical regions of Montenegro.

== Sources ==
- Anzulovic, Branimir (1999). Heavenly Serbia: From Myth to Genocide. New York and London: New York University Press. ISBN 9780814706718.
- Banac, Ivo (1988) [1st pub. 1984]. The National Question in Yugoslavia: Origins, History, Politics. Ithaca and London: Cornell University Press. ISBN 9780801494932.
- Banović, Branko (2015). The Montenegrin Warrior Tradition: Questions and Controversies over NATO Membership. New York: Palgrave Macmillan. ISBN 978-1-137-55228-0.
- Boehm, Christopher (1987) [1st pub. University Press of Kansas:1984]. Blood Revenge. The Enactment and Management of Conflict in Montenegro and Other Tribal Societies (2nd ed.). Philadelphia: University of Pennsylvania Press. ISBN 9780812212419.
- Cvijić, Jovan (1987) [1st pub. 1922]. Balkansko Poluostrvo (in Serbian). Belgrade: Srpska akademija nauka i umetnosti. ISBN 9788639100445.
- Ćirković, Sima (2004). The Serbs. Malden: Blackwell Publishing. ISBN 9781405142915.
- Đurđev, Branislav (1953). Turska vlast u Crnoj Gori u XVI i XVII veku. Prilog jednom nerešenom pitanju iz naše istorije [Turkish rule in Montenegro in the 16th and 17th centuries. Contribution to an unresolved question from our history] (in Serbian). Sarajevo: Svjetlost.
- Đurđev, Branislav (1984). Postanak i razvitak brdskih, crnogorskih i hercegovačkih plemena [The origin and development of the Highland, Montenegrin and Hercegovinian tribes] (in Serbian). Crnogorska akademija nauka i umjetnosti.
- Filipović, Milenko S. (1982). Among the People - Native Yugoslav Ethnography: Selected Writing of Milenko S. Filipović. Papers in Slavic Philology. Vol. 3. Ann Arbor: Michigan Slavic Publications. ISBN 9780930042479.
- Kovijanić, Risto (1974). Pomeni crnogorskih plemena u kotorskim spomenicima (XIV–XVI vijek) [Mentions of Montenegrin tribes in Kotor records (14th–16th centuries)] (in Serbian). Vol. II. Titograd: Istorijski institut SR Crne Gore.
- Kurtović, Esad (2011). "Seniori hercegovačkih vlaha". Hum i Hercegovina kroz povijest. Zbornik radova s međunarodnoga znanstvenog skupa održanog u Mostaru 5. i 6. studenoga 2009 (in Croatian). Zagreb: Hrvatski institut za povijest.
- Miller, William (2012) [1st pub. Cambridge University Press:1936]. The Ottoman Empire and its Successors, 1801-1927 (3rd ed.). Abingdon and New York: Routledge. ISBN 978-0-714-61974-3.
- Mirdita, Zef (2009). Vlasi – starobalkanski narod (od povijesne pojave do danas) [The Vlachs - An Old Balkan People (from their first historical appearance until today)] (in Croatian). Zagreb: Hrvatski institut za povijest. ISBN 9789536324835.
- Morrison, Kenneth (2008). Montenegro: A Modern History. London and New York: I.B.Tauris. ISBN 9780857714879.
- Motyl, Alexander J. (2001). Encyclopedia of Nationalism. Vol. 2. San Diego and London: Academic Press. ISBN 9780080545240.
- Roberts, Elizabeth (2007). Realm of the Black Mountain. A History of Montenegro. London: C. Hurst & Co. ISBN 978-185065-868-9.
- Šekularac, Božidar (2015). "Uticaj Vlaha na formiranje i razvoj crnogorskih plemena" [Impact of Vlachs on formation and development of Montenegrin tribes] (PDF). Arhivski Zapisi (in Serbian). XXII (1). Cetinje: Državni arhiv Crne Gore: 9–26.
- Vucinich, Wayne S. (1975). A study in social survival: the katun in Bileća Rudine. Denver: University of Denver.
- Vuksan, Dušan (March 1939). "Crna Gora u doba mladosti mitropolita Petra I" [Montenegro in the era of the youth of Bishop Petar I]. Zapisi. Glasnik cetinjskog istorijskog društva (in Serbian). XXI (3): 129–146.
- Zlatar, Zdenko (2007). The poetics of Slavdom: the mythopoeic foundations of Yugoslavia. Vol. 1. Peter Lang. ISBN 978-0-8204-8118-0.
