= Bratonožići =

Highlander tribe of Montenegro

The Bratonožići (Serbian Cyrillic: Братоножићи, pronounced [bräto̞no̞ʒit͡ɕi]) is a historical tribe (pleme) of Albanian origin in the Brda region of Montenegro. It appeared during the Ottoman period and was a captaincy of the Principality of Montenegro in the 19th century. Today, it forms part of northeastern Podgorica Municipality. In Montenegro, the majority of people who trace their origin in Bratonožići identify as Christian Orthodox Montenegrins and Christian Orthodox Serbs. Brotherhoods (bratstvo) from the historical tribe that settled in Bijelo Polje and became Muslims in the Ottoman period identify as Bosniaks. In the 18th century, many families from the region settled in western Serbia. In Kosovo, a part of the Serbs of northwestern Kosovo come from Bratonožići.

== Geography ==
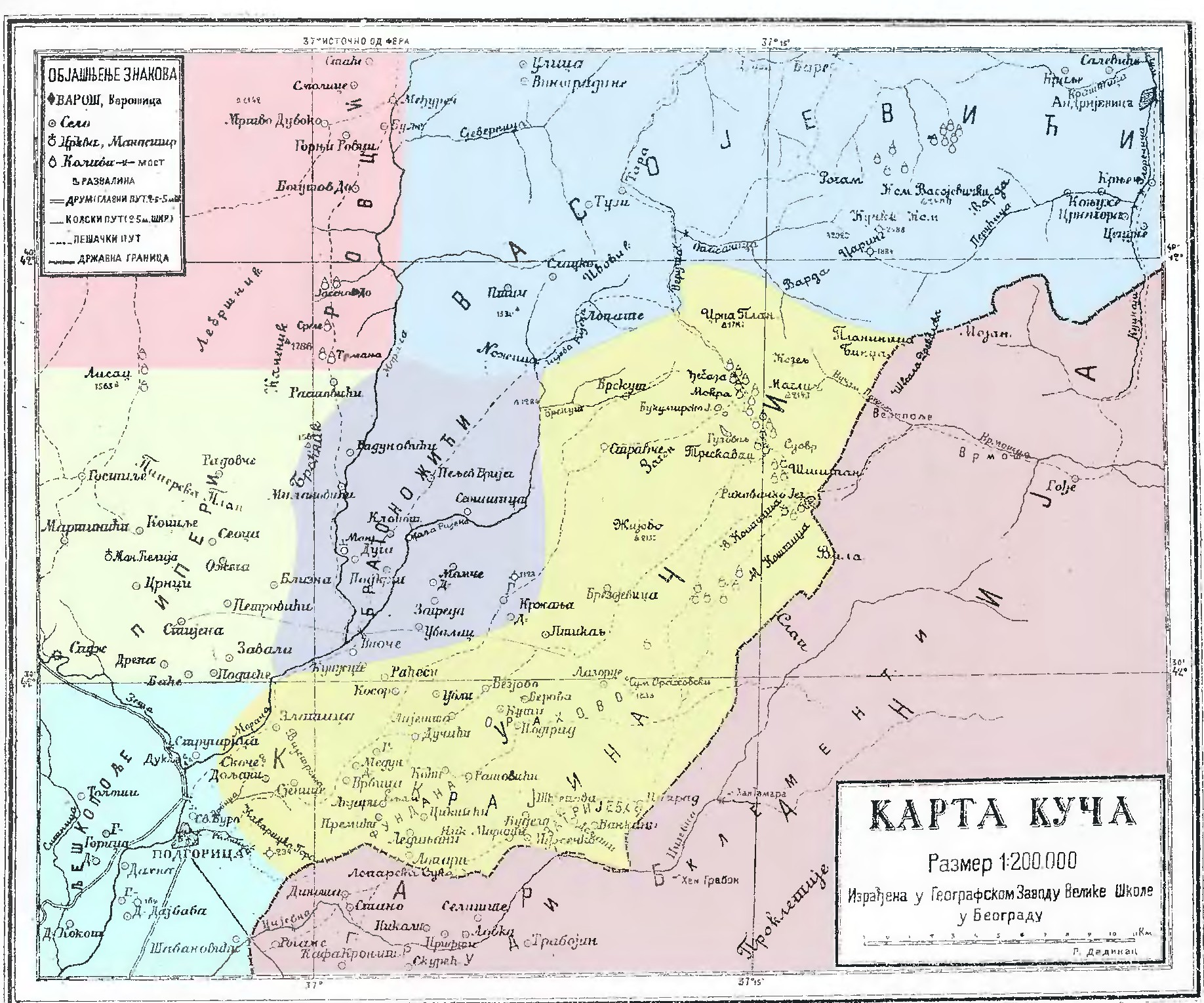
Map of Bratonožići (in purple) in the late 19th century

The Bratonožići tribal region is a rugged, hilly area at an altitude which ranges from 400 to 450m. It is situated between the Morača river, Mala Rijeka and Crna Planina; it borders the tribes of Vasojevići to the north, Rovčani to the northwest, Kuči to the east and south, and Piperi to the west. The region ends after Mala Rijeka pours into the Morača, near the settlement of Mrke, about 13 km to the northeast of Podgorica. With the exception of Mrke, most of the other localities (Klopot, Pelev Brijeg, Duga) of Bratonožići are semi-deserted or completely abandoned, their inhabitants having moved to Podgorica. In 2011, Mrke had 207 residents, 118 of whom identified themselves as Montenegrins, 60 as Serbs, while 25 chose not to declare their ethnicity.

== Language ==
The Montenegrin language dialect spoken in Bratonožići forms a speech group with Kuči and Piperi. South Slavic in these three communities is marked by close contact with the northern Albanian dialects of Malësia. The dialects of Bratonožići and Kuči which differ to a certain degree from that of Piperi, largely because of the historic bilingualism that was present in the area as a result of direct contact with Albanian.

== Origins ==
The Bratonožići (Albanian: Bratonishi) were of Albanian origin and gradually became Slavic-speakers. A Franciscan report of the 17th century illustrates the final stages of their acculturation. Its author writes that the Bratonožići, Piperi, Bjelopavlići and Kuči:" nulla di meno essegno quasi tutti del rito serviano, e di lingua Illrica ponno piu presto dirsi Schiavoni, ch' Albanesi " (since almost all of them use the Serbian rite and the Illyric (Slavic) language, soon they should be called Slavs, rather than Albanians)

== History ==
The first indirect reference to the Bratonožići comes from the 1416-17 Venetian cadaster of Shkodër. In it, a certain Marco Bratonese or Bratonesso was registered as living in Koplik where he had probably moved from one of the Zeta katuns (villages).

The first direct reference to the settlements that comprise Bratonožići today is found in the supplementary defter of the sanjak of Scutari in 1497. They hadn't formed as a single community at that time.

Bratonožići is a tribe (pleme) of several patrilineal ancestries which formed it over time since the late 15th century. The name of the tribe comes from a Brato, father of Nika and ancestor of a part of the brotherhoods of Bratonožići. He lived 14 generations before the time of the recording of the story around 1900.

Two other communities that lived in the same area were the Albanian Catholic Bukumiri and Bushati tribes and the Lutovci, who may have come from the Pirot region in the eastern Balkans or from Pilot in northern Albania. Their origin is debated because no collective memory of their history has been retained except for a toponym which may be interpreted to refer to Pirot in eastern Serbia or Pilot in northern Albania. Their first historical ancestor in Bratonožići is a captain Gojko and their historical village was Lutovo. Archival records show that the Lutovci lived in 27 households of Luskozupa in 1497 in the nahiye of Piperi, which included Bratonožići and the Piperi tribe. Over the years, a few families from neighbouring tribes like Kuči, Bjelopavlići and Piperi also settled Bratonožići and became part of the community. Bratonožići was an area of language contact between Slavic and Albanian as well as religious contact between Slavic Orthodoxy and Catholicism. Sima Milutinović Sarajlija, a Serbian Romantic nationalist, wrote in 1835 that the Bratonožići intermarried freely with their Catholic Albanian neighbours and "were attracted to Catholicism by the Albanian priests". Sarajlija reports that probably in the first half of the 17th century Rufim Njeguš managed to convert the community back to Orthodoxy by convincing them to swear an oath that marriages with Catholic Albanians would only be with Catholic Albanian women, but no women from Bratonožići would be given for marriage to Catholic Albanian men. This measure would prevent any further conversions to Catholicism. The events of the reconversion of Bratonožići are regarded as an important step for the reinforcement of what was termed as Serbdom (Srbstvo) and Orthodoxy in Montenegro by 19th century Serbian historiography.

The tribe was often in conflict with the Kuči over grazing lands. Bratonožići often attacked Rovca, who were always defended by the Moračani. They also often fought with the Vasojevići.

Venetian public servant Mariano Bolizza's 1614 report that the villages of Kuči, Bratonožići and part of Plav were under the soldiers of Medun, the spahee, but the commander was not named; and the highlanders would pay the Ottoman officials a portion of their income. The report registered the Bratanosich as an Orthodox village of Serbian or Greek rite with 87 houses, and 260 men in arms commanded by Stanoje Radonjin. In 1658, the seven tribes of Kuči, Vasojevići, Bratonožići, Piperi, Klimenti, Hoti and Gruda allied themselves with the Republic of Venice, establishing the so-called "Seven-fold barjak" or "alaj-barjak", against the Ottomans. According to Historians Simo Milutinović and Dimitrije Milaković, the Catholic Kuči, Bratonožići and Drekalovići tribe has converted to Orthodoxy by Rufim Boljević. In 1689, an uprising broke out in Piperi, Rovca, Bjelopavlići, Bratonožići, Kuči and Vasojevići, while at the same time an uprising broke out in Prizren, Peć, Priština and Skopje, and then in Kratovo and Kriva Palanka in October (Karposh's Rebellion).

During the Velika attacks (1879), the battalions of the Moračani and Bratonožići fought off the Albanians. At the subsequent Battle of Novšiće, the battalions of Kuči, Vasojevići and Bratonožići fought the Albanian irregulars under the command of Ali Pasha of Gusinje, and were defeated. Soon after Battle of Novšiće in the same area, the Battle of Murino broke out in which Ottomans with Albanian irregulars attacked again less numerous forces of Principality of Montenegro and were heavily defeated by battalions of Bratonožići, Vasojevići and Moračani. At the beginning of the 20th century, the region had ca. 400 houses.

== Brotherhoods and families ==
All brotherhoods of the tribe have as Slava (patron saints) Saint Nicholas (Sveti Nikola) and Saint John (Sveti Jovan). The families of Bratonožići are: Avramović, Bajović, Baljević, Balević, Baličević, Barjaktarović, Baržić, Biljurić, Bismiljak, Bošković, Branković, Butrić, Caričić, Cmiljanić, Četković, Čađenović, Čubranović, Čolić, Ćeklić, Darmanović, Dmitrović, Dokić, Đelević, Đukić, Đurđević, Đurić, Femić, Garić, Gilić, Gogić, Grujić, Gudović, Ilić, Janković, Jelavić, Jovanović, Jovović, Kaluđerović, Keljanović, Keković, Korać, Krkelić, Lajkovič, Lainović, Lalović, Lašević, Liković, Lukić, Lutovac, Ljajinović, Ljajković, Ljaljović, Ljaković, Ljašović, Malević, Marnić, Macura, Mihailović, Mihajlović, Milovanović, Mirković, Muratović, Novović, Nedovic, Obrenović, Pavićević, Pavličić, Pejušković, Perović, Praščević, Prelevčanin, Premović, Progonovići, Radojević, Radosević, Radunović, Raketić, Rakić, Ratković, Sekulović, Stanišić, Stanković, Strahinjić, Šćepančević, Šajinović, Šaković, Šoškić, Toljević, Todorović, Tomašević, Tošković, Trimojević, Ugričić, Veljić, Veljović, Velimirović, Vesković, Vidić, Vujović, Vujotić, Vukajlović, Vuković, Vukorepović, Vulić, Vučelić, Vučinić, Živković, Žmikić. The Muslim Bratonožići of Bijelo Polje include Huremovići, Koraći, Ljaljevići, Polumente, Uremovići.

== Notable people ==
- Miloš Obrenović I of Serbia, Prince of Serbia and founder of the House of Obrenović.
- Mihailo Obrenović III of Serbia, Prince of Serbia (1839–42, 1860–68), considered modern Serbia’s most enlightened ruler.
- Uroš Tošković, genius and painter
- Niša Saveljić, Montenegrin former professional footballer, by paternal descent.
- Esteban Saveljich, Montenegrin professional footballer, by paternal descent
- Nemanja Bešović, Serbian professional basketball player.
- Milorad Vučelić, Serbian journalist and businessman.
- Žarko Korać, former Prime Minister of Serbia.
- Radivoj Korać, Serbian and Yugoslav professional basketball player.
- Dado Polumenta, Montenegrin pop-folk recording artist.
- Šako Polumenta, Montenegrin pop-folk singer.

== Sources ==
- Banac, Ivo (1988). The National Question in Yugoslavia: Origins, History, Politics. Cornell University Press. ISBN 0801494931.
- Erdeljanović, Jovan (1907). Kuči, Bratonožići, Piperi.
  - Erdeljanović, Jovan (1907). Bratonožići, pleme u Crnogorskim brdima.
- Novo Vuković (1996). Književnost Crne Gore od XII do XIX vijeka: Primeri čojstva i junaštva. Obod.
- Miomir Dašić (1986). Vasojevići: od pomena do 1860. godine. Narodna knjiga. ISBN 9788633100847.
- Mirko S. Radoičić (1966). Hercegovina i Crna Gora 1875-1878. Savez udruženja boraca NOR-a, Opštinski odbor.
- Milo Marković (2014). Bratonožići kroz istoriju.
- Pavlović, Aleksandar (2019). ""Forging the enemy: the transformation of common Serbian-Albanian traits into enmity and political hostility"". In Pavlović, Aleksandar; Draško, Gazela Pudar; Halili, Rigels (eds.). Rethinking Serbian-Albanian Relations: Figuring out the Enemy. Routledge. ISBN 9781351273145.
- Pulaha, Selami (1974). Defter i Sanxhakut të Shkodrës 1485. Academy of Sciences of Albania.
- Strugar, Vlado (1987). Prošlost Crne Gore kao predmet naučnog istraživanja i obrade. Crnogorska akademija nauka i umjetnosti. ISBN 9788672150018.
