= Branislav Djurdjev =

Yugoslav and Serbian historian (1908–1993)

- Бранислав Ђурђев; Branislav Đurđev
- Born: 4 August 1908; Sremski Karlovci, Kingdom of Croatia-Slavonia, Austria-Hungary
- Died: 6 February 1993 (aged 84); Novi Sad, Vojvodina, Federal Republic of Yugoslavia
- Occupation: Historian
- Years active: 1934–1979
- Awards: ZAVNOBiH Award; AVNOJ Award; Order of Labour of the 2nd Order; Order of the Republic with a Golden Wreath

Academic background
- Thesis: Kakva je bila turska vlast u Crnoj Gori u XVI i XVII veku (1952)

Academic work
- Notable works: Turska vlast u Crnoj Gori u XVI i XVII veku: prilog jednom nerešenom pitanju iz naše istorije; Uloga crkve u starijoj istoriji srpskog naroda; Postanak i razvitak brdskih, crnogorskih i hercegovačkih plemena

Branislav Djurdjev (Serbian: Бранислав Ђурђев, Branislav Đurđev, pronounced [brǎnislaʋ dʑǔːrdʑɛv̞]; 4 August 1908 – 26 February 1993) was a Yugoslav and Serbian historian and orientalist who worked in Sarajevo for nearly forty years. A Marxist, he was one of the most prominent historians of the Socialist Federal Republic of Yugoslavia and helped in the founding of the Oriental Institute in Sarajevo in 1950, becoming its first director.

His scholarly interests covered the period of Ottoman rule in the Balkans up to the end of the 18th century, as well as the methodology and theory of historical science. (Note: The concept of "historical science" as providing "definite analysis and evaluation" of events and personalities using arguments and explanations in the "spirit of science" was a facet of socialist ideology in the former Yugoslavia.) He studied the character of Turkish–Ottoman feudalism, the influence of Turkish domination on the development of the Balkan peoples, the organisation of Vlach communities in the Western Balkans, the role of Christians in the Ottoman military organisation, the tribal organisation of Herzegovina and Montenegro, the position of the Serbian Church in the Ottoman state and its importance for the survival of the Serbian people. His theoretical interests focused on sociology, philosophy, periodization of history and criticism of post-Marxist historical theory. His research was mainly based on Ottoman archives, which he studied at the archives of the Prime Ministry office in Istanbul.

As a highly prolific scholar, he authored or co-authored over 300 books, papers, and other academic contributions from 1934 to 1991. His most notable works are Turska vlast u Crnoj Gori u XVI i XVII veku: prilog jednom nerešenom pitanju iz naše istorije [The Turkish rule in Montenegro in the 16th and 17th centuries: contribution to an unresolved question from our history], published in 1953; Uloga crkve u starijoj istoriji srpskog naroda [The role of the Church in the earlier history of the Serbian people], published in 1964; and Postanak i razvitak brdskih, crnogorskih i hercegovačkih plemena [The origin and development of the Brda, Montenegrin and Herzegovinian tribes], published in 1984.

He was one of the first regular members of the Academy of Sciences and Arts of Bosnia and Herzegovina, where he served as the president from 1968 to 1971. Djurdjev also held membership of the Yugoslav Academy of Science and Arts, the Slovenian Academy of Sciences and Arts and the Macedonian Academy of Sciences and Arts. Additionally, he was an associate member of the Montenegrin Academy of Sciences and Arts from its creation in 1976 and was appointed an external member of the Serbian Academy of Sciences and Arts towards the end of his life.

Djurdjev was honored with numerous distinctions throughout his life for his extensive scholarly contributions and active involvement in society. Notable among these are the ZAVNOBiH Award in 1975 and the AVNOJ Award in 1977. In addition, he received prestigious Yugoslav decorations, including the Order of Labour of the 2nd Order (Serbo-Croatian: Orden rada II reda) and the Order of the Republic with a Golden Wreath (Serbo-Croatian: Orden Republike sa zlatnim vencem).

== Biography ==
=== Early life ===
Branislav Djurdjev was born in a religious family on 4 August 1908, in the town of Sremski Karlovci in the Syrmia County of the Kingdom of Croatia-Slavonia, in Austria-Hungary. His father served as an Orthodox priest in Perlez, in Banat, where Djurdjev spent his youth and completed elementary school.

Djurdjev completed the first five grades of secondary school in his native town of Sremski Karlovci. During this time, he drew inspiration from the 19th-century romantic ideals of figures like Branko Radičević along with many other Serbian poets and writers from Serbian Vojvodina. Subsequently, he moved to Vrbas to complete his final three years of secondary school, where he successfully passed the high school exam in 1928. His academic path continued with a graduation in history and oriental philology from the Faculty of Philosophy at the University of Belgrade in 1934.

While pursuing his studies, Djurdjev became engaged in the communist movement, an involvement that resulted in his imprisonment and appearance before the Court for State Protection of the Kingdom of Yugoslavia. As a disciplinary measure, he was required to serve in the infantry battalion in Nevesinje, within the Zeta Banovina. Despite having already published his first scientific paper in 1934, this event prevented him from pursuing an academic career for three years, leading him to return to Perlez, where he lived in his parents' house and made a living as a professional fisherman. At the same time, he embarked on scholarly activities and joined the Historical Society in Novi Sad in 1936. He eventually secured a position in his field as a teacher at a private secondary school in Belgrade in the autumn of 1937.

=== Initial research ===
Thanks to his exceptional proficiency in the Turkish language, Djurdjev was granted a scholarship from the Turkish government in December 1937 to pursue postgraduate studies in Istanbul. Alongside his studies in oriental philology at the Faculty of Letters of the Istanbul University, under the supervision of İsmail Hakkı Uzunçarşılı, he initiated research in the Archives of the Prime Minister's office (Turkish: Başvekalet Arşivi), delving into the subject of "Montenegro under Turkish Rule". During this period, he discovered two defters pertaining to the Montenegrin Sanjak during the era of Skender-Bey Crnojević. However, his studies in Istanbul were abruptly halted in December 1938 when, based on the Stojadinović government's recommendation, the Turkish government withdrew his scholarship due to his involvement in communist activities. After returning to Yugoslavia, he spent some time unemployed in Perlez once again.

=== Professional career ===
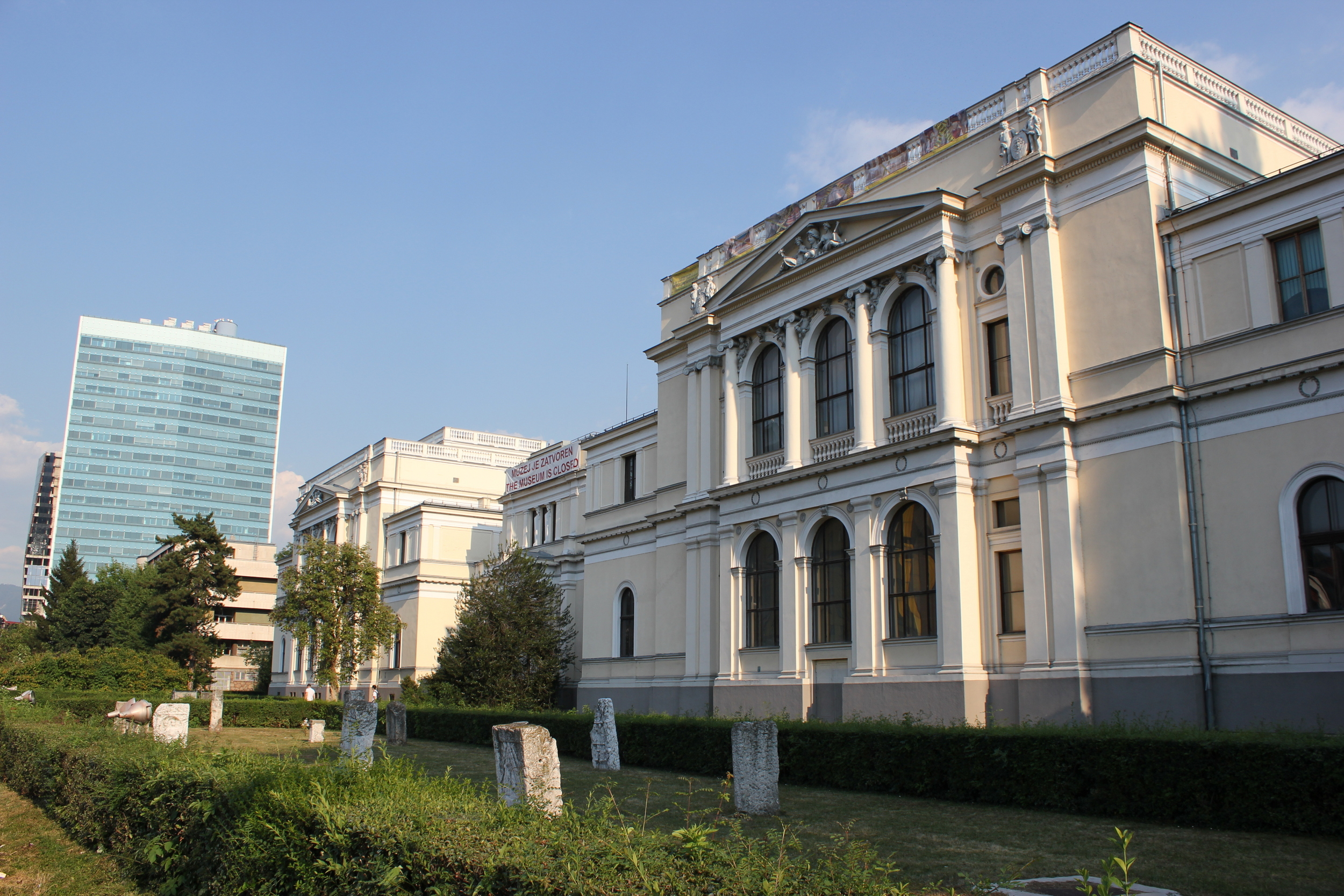
The National Museum of Bosnia and Herzegovina, in Sarajevo, where Djurdjev worked for some time in the "Turkish Archive"

In April 1939, he moved to Sarajevo where he secured permanent employment as a curator-archivist at the National Museum. There, he undertook the responsibilities of the "Turkish Archive", meticulously organizing archival and manuscript materials according to modern archiving methods. He retained this role until World War II erupted in Yugoslavia in April 1941, when he was captured and subsequently interned in the prisoner-of-war camp of Stalag X-B in Germany, where he remained until August 1945. During his captivity, he actively participated in anti-fascist initiatives and assumed the leadership of the anti-fascist council within the camp.

After his return from German captivity, Djurdjev spent a short time in Perlez before being appointed as the director of the newly established Museum in Zrenjanin. At the same time, he also embraced several other social roles. In April 1946, with his consent and by the decision of the Government of the Federal People's Republic of Yugoslavia, he was reappointed to his pre-war position at the National Museum in Sarajevo. There, he continued to manage the "Turkish Archive" as a scientific collaborator until 1950. In March 1950, he was appointed an associate professor and vice dean of the newly established Faculty of Philosophy in Sarajevo. In the same year, he proposed the establishment of the Oriental Institute in Sarajevo, a suggestion accepted by the government of the People's Republic of Bosnia and Herzegovina. He became the first director of the institute, a position he held until 1964.

Branislav Djurdjev defended his doctoral thesis before the examination committee of the Serbian Academy of Sciences and Arts in 1952. The title of his dissertation was Kakva je bila turska vlast u Crnoj Gori u XVI i XVII veku [What was the Turkish rule in Montenegro in the 16th and 17th centuries], and it was published the following year in Sarajevo under the title Turska vlast u Crnoj Gori u XVI i XVII veku: prilog jednom nerešenom pitanju iz naše istorije [The Turkish rule in Montenegro in the 16th and 17th centuries: a contribution to an unresolved question from our history]. In 1957, he was appointed as a full professor at the Faculty of Philosophy at the University of Sarajevo. There, he taught subjects like Methodology of Historical Science, Introduction to Historical Science, and Histories of the South Slavs in the Early modern period (the "Turkish era"). Additionally, he served as the dean of the Faculty of Philosophy in Sarajevo in 1964 and 1965. Even after his retirement in 1973, he continued to teach Introduction to Historical Science at the same institution until 1979.

=== Latest years ===
After retiring in Novi Sad in 1979, he returned to Sarajevo a few years later and remained there during 1992 when the siege of the town began. However, as his illness worsened, he was transferred to Novi Sad with the assistance of UNPROFOR, where he died on 26 February 1993 at the age of 84.

== Impact ==
Djurdjev was one of the most prominent Yugoslav historians of his time, and he left a significant impact on the development of Yugoslav oriental studies and history. His studies in history and oriental philology at the Faculty of Philosophy in Belgrade, as well as his time spent at the Literary Faculty in Istanbul, led Djurdjev to the exploration of the history of the South Slavic peoples during Ottoman rule. In addition, during his tenure at the Oriental Institute in Sarajevo, Djurdjev organized the collection, translation, and edition of previously unpublished archival materials, leading him to make multiple visits to the Istanbul Archive between 1951 and 1955. With colleagues, he processed and prepared for publication several books of primary sources related to the history of South Slavic peoples under the Ottoman rule, focusing on kanun-names and defters. During this period, a significant portion of the archival and manuscript material held at the Oriental Institute was collected.

Djurdjev also initiated the publication of the influential annual journal of the Oriental Institute titled Prilozi za orijentalnu filologiju [Contributions to Oriental Philology], and played a key role in establishing the collection Monumenta Turcica historiam Slavorum Meridionalium illustrantia. The latter was established to systematically and purposefully publish Turkish sources related to the history of South Slavic peoples.

Djurdjev's research primarily focused on the history of South Slavic peoples under Ottoman rule. Overcoming the limitations of traditional historiography on the subject, he developed new approaches and offered new views that had a profound impact on Ottoman studies in the Yugoslav period. In particular, Djurdjev's analysis highlighted the contradictory nature of the initial impact of the Ottomans on Balkan society, in stark contrast with the prevailing Russian and Turkish views of the time, which tended to emphasize unilaterally either destruction and repression, or pacification and prosperity, as the result of the Ottoman conquest. Despite very strong Marxist convictions apparent in his writings, Djurdjev was regarded in the West as one of the most prominent specialists of the Ottoman period in the Yugoslav lands. Among the works that particularly mark this part of Branislav Djurdjev's scientific pursuits are studies on the social and class nature of Ottoman feudalism, with special reference to the issue of property, then on the position and behavior of certain social classes in the Balkans during the Ottoman conquests and later. One of Djurdjev's main theories concerned the identity of the Vlachs of the Western Balkans. According to the historian, the term "Vlach", although initially denoting an ethnonym, acquired a socio-economic dimension in the Middle Ages as the Vlachs became Slavicized, and became a term designating the members of a semi-nomadic shepherd community, organized on the basis of a clan system, in contrast to the sedentary majority of Balkan feudal societies (cf. Vlachs (social class)). This work was followed by a study of the status and role of the Serbian Orthodox Church, first during the Nemanjić period and then, especially, during the Ottoman rule.

Another aspect of Djurdjev's work, which spanned from the first half of the 1950s to the late 1980s, concerned the question of the origin of the tribes of Montenegro. Contradicting Jovan Erdeljanović's theory of continuity and similar hypotheses of other ethnologists, Djurdjev put forward, in a very well-argued and documented manner, the predominant role of Vlach katuns in the formation of Montenegrin tribes. According to Djurdjev, the backward areas of Montenegro and Herzegovina preserved the katuns from the influence of the feudal states, before the collapse of the latter allowed the katuns to develop as tribes.

Towards the end of his scientific career, Djurdjev developed a passion for the theory of history. He tackled the theory of Marxism with varying degrees of success and critically examined the post-Marxist theses of many scholars. An active participant in numerous academic conferences, congresses, and round tables in the field of history, both nationally and internationally, he became primarily recognized for his sharp and polemical contributions, leading him to be remembered by his contemporaries as an intriguing yet controversial figure.

== Criticism and controversies ==
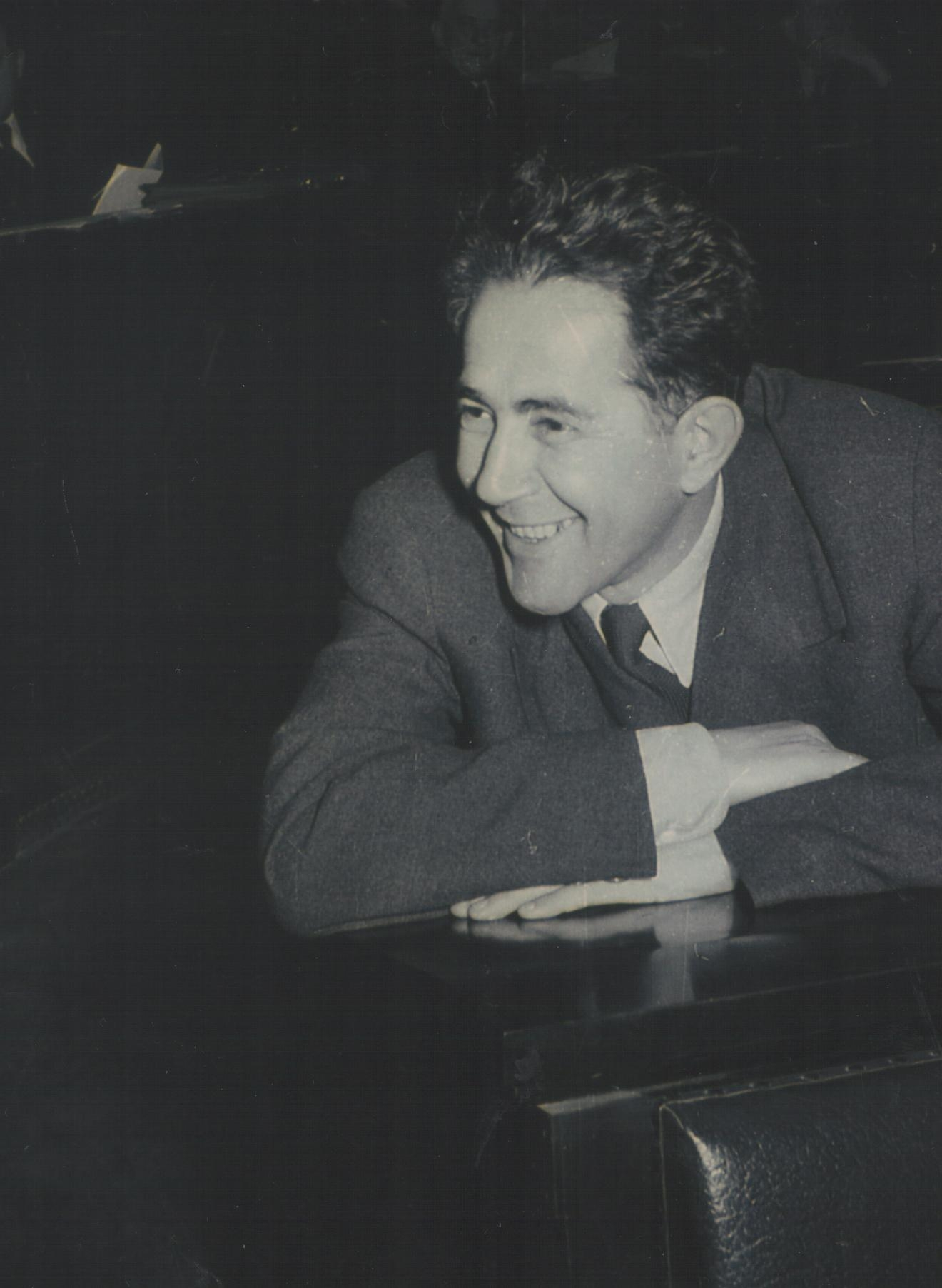
Milovan Djilas, pictured in 1950, was one of Djurdjev's most ardent supporters within the Yugoslav Communist Party

From the 1950s onwards, Djurdjev was involved in some of the most heated debates in Yugoslav historiography. The first of these took place in the first half of the 1950s, when Djurdjev criticized the economist Sergije Dimitrijević over the nature of "Ottoman feudalism". Djurdjev, for whom Ottoman rule was less oppressive than the Serbian feudal state, nonetheless considered it reactionary because, according to his Marxist views, it had delayed the peasant revolution. The historian went so far as to describe Dimitrijević's positions as "nihilistic".

Djurdjev's innovative views, particularly those expressed in his thesis, published in 1953, which challenged the traditional idea that Montenegro had been virtually independent of the Ottoman Empire, enjoyed strong political support in the person of Milovan Djilas, who celebrated Djurdjev as a "de-mystifier" of the national past. However, the fall of Djilas the following year and his imprisonment in 1956 opened the way to a flood of criticism, which in turn affected Djurdjev, who had to put his career on hold for two years.

As a Marxist historian, Djurdjev was in fact in line with the ideological directives of the Yugoslav Communist Party. Thus, according to Slobodan Naumović, his apparently convincing answer to the question of the origin of the Montenegrin tribes can also be explained as an "ideologically correct" explanation of a problem closely related to the question of the status of the Montenegrin nation.

And despite his concern for the philosophy of history and his critique of dogmatic Marxism, Djurdjev remained the defender of a dogmatic Marxist approach to historiography, entirely closed to the most important ideas of 20th-century historical thought. This led him to become conservative about attempts to modernize Yugoslav historiography, undertaken by a new generation of Yugoslav historians from the 1960s onwards. Among these, Mirjana Gross stood out for her university textbook published in 1976, which became the first book entirely devoted to the history of historiography and the theory of historical studies in the Serbo-Croatian linguistic area. At the same time, Gross insisted on the need to modernize Yugoslav historiography according to the paradigm of the Annales school. This provoked a heated dispute with Djurdjev, who rejected Gross's "so-called structuralist approach to history" in the late 1970s.

== Awards and honors ==

During the era of socialist Yugoslavia, Branislav Djurdjev received several awards for his scholarly work and social engagement: the Award of the Government of the People's Federal Republic of Yugoslavia (1949), the 27th-July Award of the Socialist Republic of Bosnia and Herzegovina (1960), the ZAVNOBiH Award for the book The role of the Church in the earlier history of the Serbian people (1975), and the AVNOJ Award (1977). He was also decorated with several high honors, including the Order of Labour of the 2nd Order, the Order of the Republic with a Silver Wreath, the Order of Merit for the People with a Golden Star, and the Order of the Republic with a Golden Wreath.

== Selected bibliography ==
Apart from his doctoral thesis, Branislav Djurdjev's major works include a study on the position of Montenegro during the Ottoman rule, in which he showed the unsustainability of the previous romantic notions that Montenegro never recognized Ottoman rule. Djurdjev also made a significant contribution to the history of the peoples of former Yugoslavia, particularly the second volume, for which he was a member of the core editorial team, alongside Jorjo Tadić and Bogo Grafenauer. As an extremely prolific scholar, Djurdjev's comprehensive bibliography, including books, articles, discussions and overall scientific contributions, numbers 309 references.

=== As sole author ===
- Turska vlast u Crnoj Gori u XVI i XVII veku: prilog jednom nerešenom pitanju iz naše istorije [The Turkish rule in Montenegro in the 16th and 17th centuries: a contribution to an unresolved question from our history] (in Serbo-Croatian). Sarajevo: Svjetlost. 1953.
- Uloga crkve u starijoj istoriji srpskog naroda [The role of the Church in the earlier history of the Serbian people] (in Serbo-Croatian). Sarajevo: Svjetlost. 1964.
- Dva deftera Crne Gore iz vremena Skender-bega Crnojevića [Two defters of Montenegro from the time of Skender-Bey Crnojević] (in Serbo-Croatian). Vol. 1. Sarajevo: Akademija nauka i umjetnosti Bosne i Hercegovine. 1968.
- Postanak i razvitak brdskih, crnogorskih i hercegovačkih plemena [The origin and development of the Brda, Montenegrin and Herzegovinian tribes] (in Serbo-Croatian). Titograd: Crnogorska akademija nauka i umjetnosti. 1984.
- Zur neumarxistischen Geschichtsauffassung: Beiträge auf Historikerkongressen, Vorträge und Aufsätze [On the neo-Marxist Conception of History: Contributions at Historians' Congresses, Lectures and Essays] (in German). Novi Sad: Vojvođanska akademija nauka i umetnosti. 1987.

=== As co-author ===
- Đurđev, Branislav; Filipović, Nedim; Hadžibegić, Hamid, eds. (1957). Kanuni i kanun-name za bosanski, hercegovački, zvornički, kliški, crnogorski i skadarski sandžak [Kanuns and kanun-names for the sanjaks of Bosnia, Herzegovina, Zvornik, Klis, Montenegro and Skadar] (in Serbo-Croatian). Sarajevo: Orijentalni institut.
- Babić, Vladimir; Čubrilović, Vaso; Đurđev, Branislav; Filipović, Nedim; Gestrin, Ferdo; Grafenauer, Bogo; Klaić, Nada; Lape, Ljuben; Lebl, Arpad; Mitrović, Mitra; Moačanin, Fedor; Tadić, Jorjo; Zwitter, Fran (1959). Historija naroda Jugoslavije [History of the People of Yugoslavia] (in Serbo-Croatian). Vol. 2. Zagreb: Školska knjiga.
- Đurđev, Branislav; Hadžiosmanović, Lamija (1973). Dva deftera Crne Gore iz vremena Skender-bega Crnojevića [Two defters of Montenegro from the time of Skender-Bey Crnojević] (in Serbo-Croatian). Vol. 2. Sarajevo: Akademija nauka i umjetnosti Bosne i Hercegovine.
