= Old Montenegro =

Term used for the embryonic part of modern Montenegro

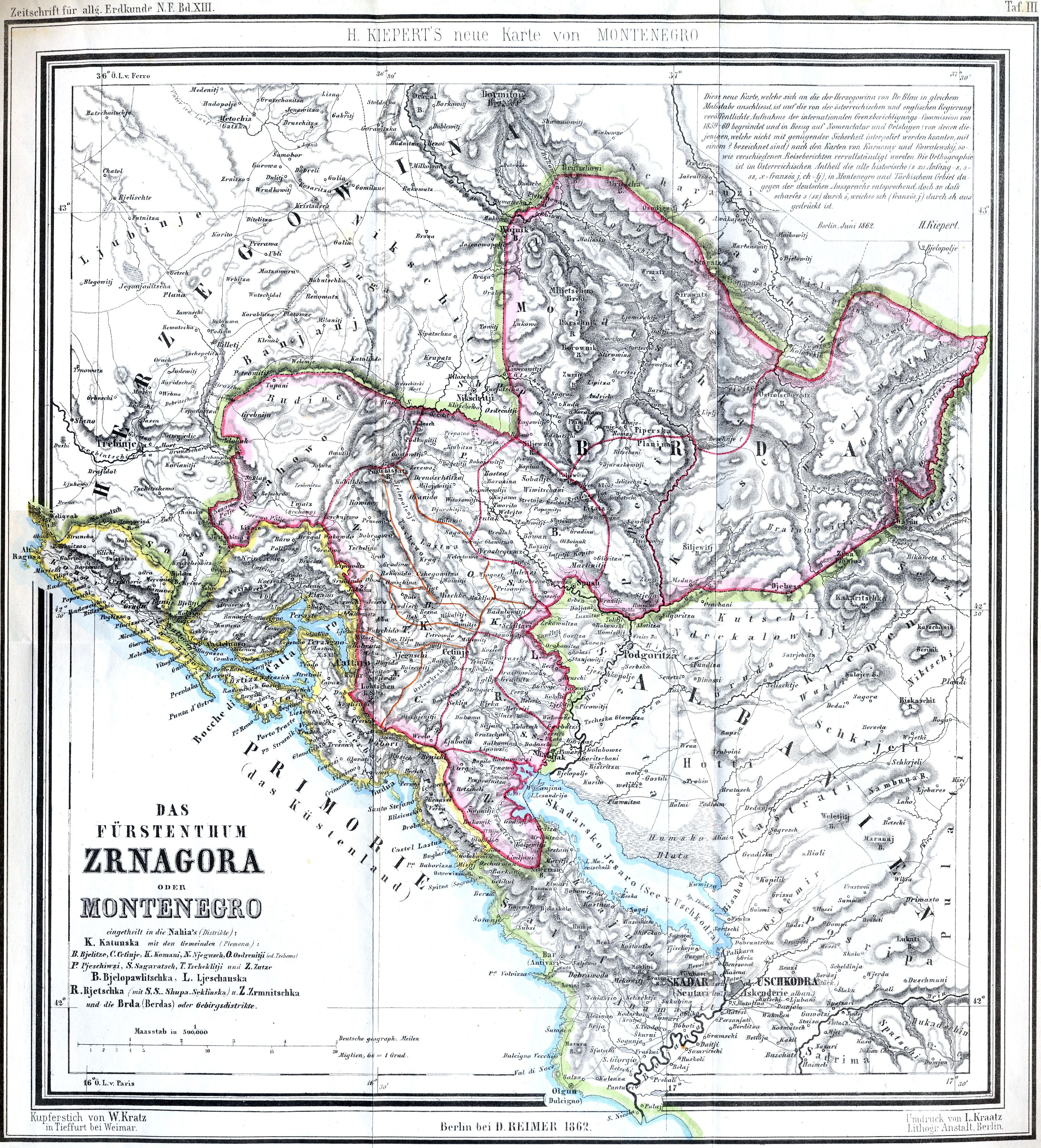
Regions of Old Montenegro and the Highlands (Brda) tribes in 1862.

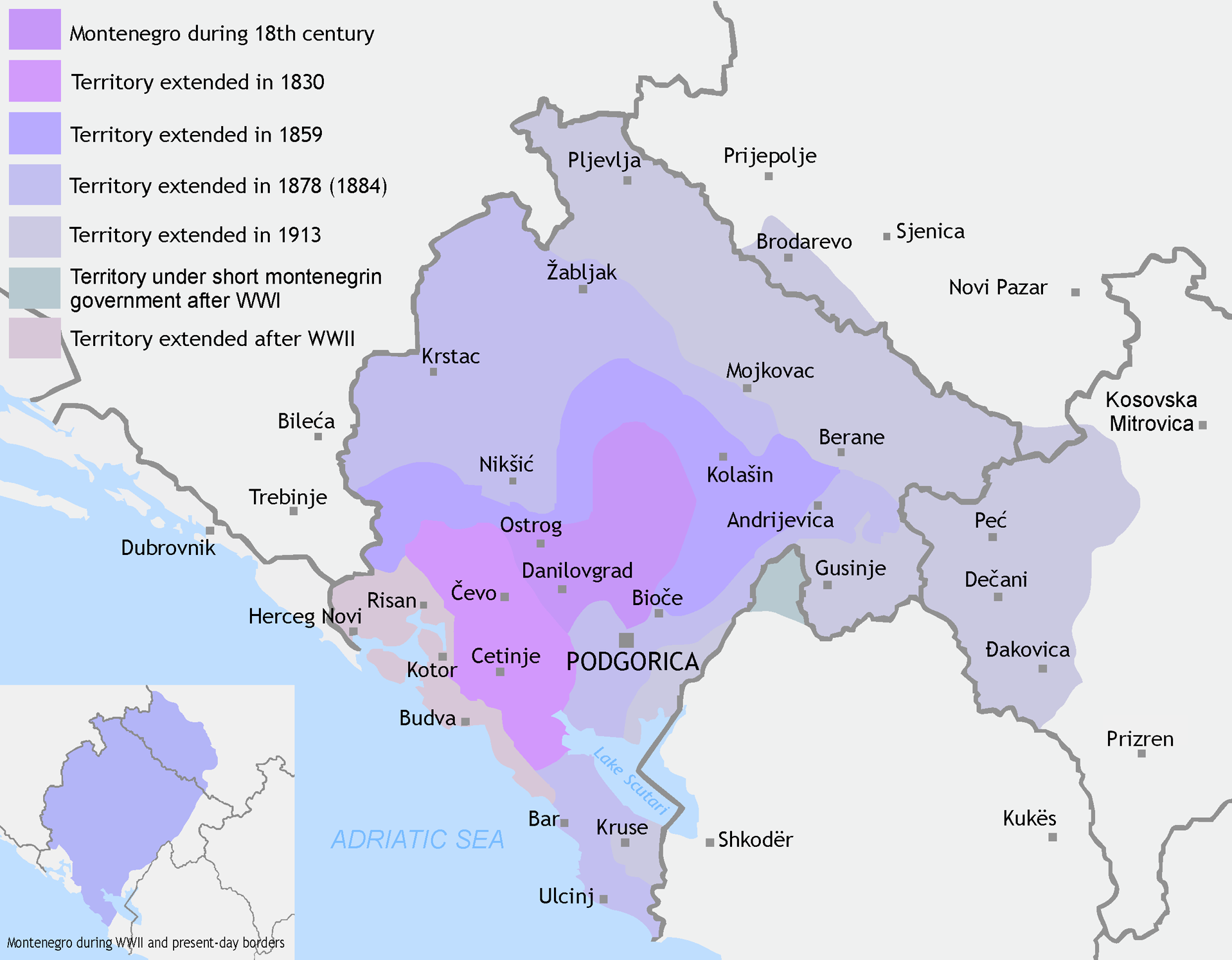
Expansion of Montenegro: the region of Old Montenegro represented in the darkest shade (18th century)

Historical map of the Old Montenegro region, and its divisions

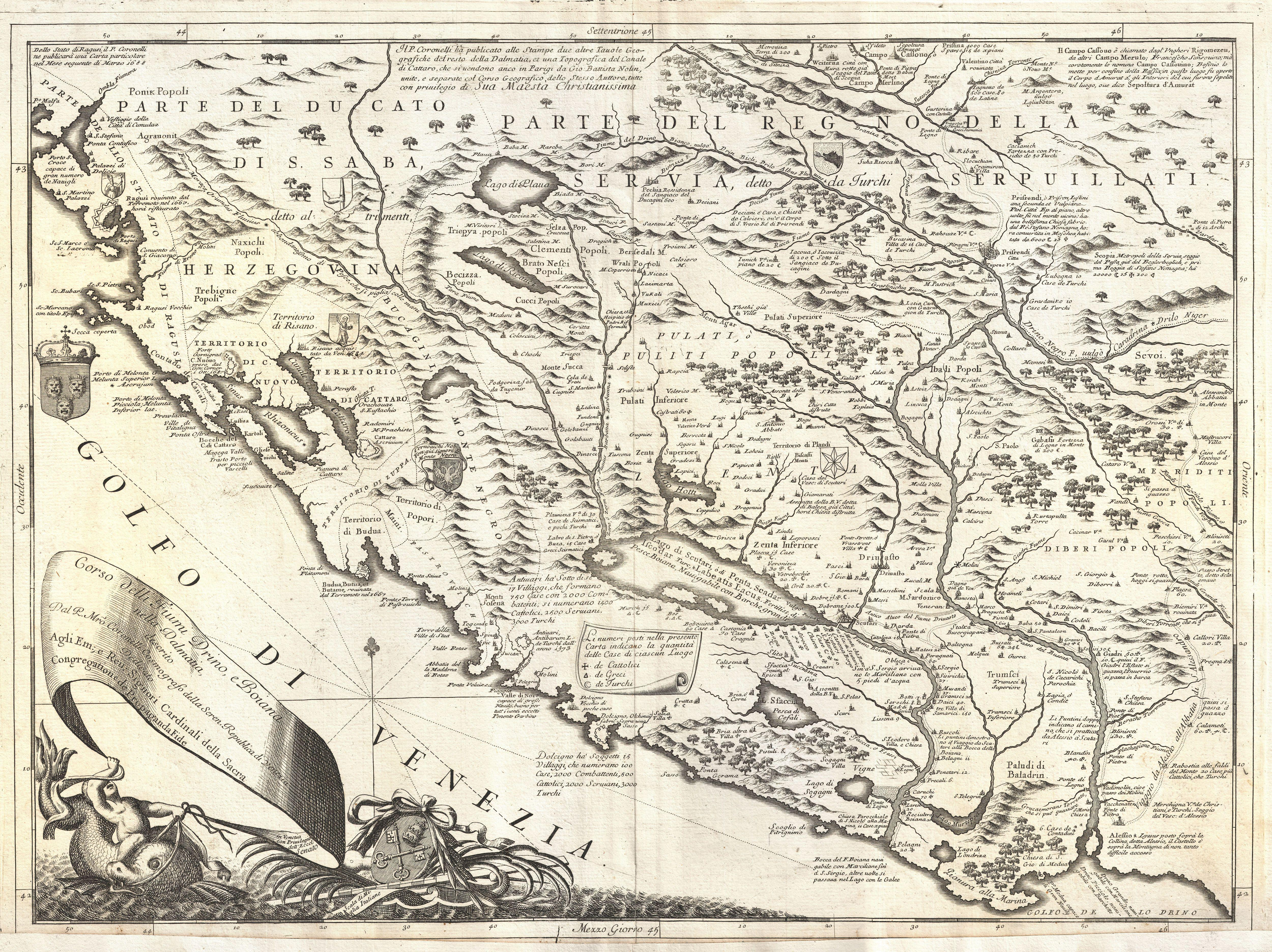
Coronelli Map of the Skadar Lake region, including the Old Montenegro (1690)

Old Montenegro (Montenegrin: Stara Crna Gora / Стара Црна Гора), also known as Montenegro proper (Prava Crna Gora / Права Црна Гора), or True Montenegro (Istinska Crna Gora / Истинска Црна Гора), is a term used for the embryonic part of modern Montenegro. In historical context, the term designates the original territory of the Principality of Montenegro, before the territorial expansion, ratified by the Congress of Berlin in 1878, or even more precisely - the territory of the Prince-Bishopric of Montenegro prior to its unification with the region of Brda in 1796.

During the Ottoman period, from the 16th up to the 18th century, the original (proper) Montenegro was made up of the Montenegrin tribes (Montenegrin: crnogorska plemena / црногорска племена), traditionally divided into four territorial units, or nahije: Katun, Rijeka, Lješ and Crmnica. Their inhabitants were known under the regional demonym Montenegrins (Crnogorci / Црногорци), as opposed to the inhabitants of neighboring regions (Brđani, Hercegovci and Primorci). Since the end of the 18th century, Montenegro started to expand, incorporating the region of Brda from 1796 onwards, the region of Old Herzegovina and part of Primorje in 1878, and finally upper and central Polimlje and northern Metohija in 1912.

== Tribes ==
Tribes, divided by nahija. historically, there are four nahijas in the Old Montenegro region, further divided by local tribes (clans);

- Katunska nahija
  - Njeguši
  - Cetinje
  - Ćeklići
  - Bjelice
  - Ozrinići
  - Cuce
  - Komani
  - Zagarač
  - Pješivci
- Riječka nahija
  - Ceklin
  - Ljubotinj
  - Dobrsko Selo
  - Kosjeri
  - Građani
- Lješanska nahija
  - Draževina
  - Gradac
  - Buronje
- Crmnička nahija
  - Podgor
  - Sotonići
  - Dupilo
  - Brčeli
  - Gluhi Do
  - Limljani
  - Boljevići
  - Seoca

== See also ==
- History of Montenegro
- Regions of Montenegro
- Sanjak of Montenegro
- Prince-Bishopric of Montenegro
- Brda (Montenegro)
- Old Herzegovina
- Primorje (Montenegro)
- Serbs of Montenegro

== Anthropology ==
A number of toponyms and names of clans in Old Montenegro are originally derived from Albanian onomastics, such as Gjin, Gjon, Progon, Lesh, Mal and others, with some of them being: Đinov Do village in Cuce, Đinovo Brdo in Cetinje, Đinova Glavica in Pješivci, the village of Đinovići in Kosijeri, the Đonovići brotherhood in Brčeli of Crmnica, Lješanska nahija, along with its villages Liješnje, Štitari, Goljemadi and Progonovići, the village of Lješev Stup and the toponym Malošin do in Bjelice, the village of Arbanas in Ceklin.

== Sources ==
- Banac, Ivo (1992) [1984]. The National Question in Yugoslavia: Origins, History, Politics (2. printing of the 2. ed.). Ithaca, N.Y: Cornell University Press. ISBN 0801494931.
- Bataković, Dušan T., ed. (2005). Histoire du peuple serbe [History of the Serbian People] (in French). Lausanne: L’Age d’Homme. ISBN 9782825119587.
- Bećković, Matija (2005). A Stone Between Two Worlds. Toronto: Serbian Literary Company. ISBN 9780973026450.
- Brown, Alec (1954). Yugoslav Life and Landscape. London: Elek Books.
- Ćirković, Sima (2004). The Serbs. Malden: Blackwell Publishing. ISBN 9781405142915.
- Denton, William (1877). Montenegro, its people and their history. London: Daldy, Isbister & Company.
- Ердељановић, Јован (1926). Стара Црна Гора: Етничка прошлост и формирање црногорских племена. Српски етнографски зборник. Vol. 39. Београд: Српска краљевска академија.
- Fine, John Van Antwerp Jr. (1994) [1987]. The Late Medieval Balkans: A Critical Survey from the Late Twelfth Century to the Ottoman Conquest. Ann Arbor, Michigan: University of Michigan Press. ISBN 0472082604.
- Fleming, Thomas (2002). Montenegro: The Divided Land. Rockford, Illinois: Chronicles Press. ISBN 9780961936495.
- Jelavich, Barbara (1983a). History of the Balkans: Eighteenth and Nineteenth Centuries. Vol. 1. Cambridge University Press. ISBN 9780521252492.
- Jelavich, Barbara (1983b). History of the Balkans: Twentieth Century. Vol. 2. Cambridge University Press. ISBN 9780521274593.
- Радусиновић, Павле С. (1985a). Насеља Старе Црне Горе: Општи дио. Vol. 1. Београд: Српска академија наука и уметности.
- Радусиновић, Павле С. (1985b). Насеља Старе Црне Горе: Посебни дио. Vol. 2. Београд: Српска академија наука и уметности.
- Stefanović-Karadžić, Vuk (1837). Montenegro und die Montenegriner: Ein Beitrag zur Kenntniss der europäischen Türkei und des serbischen Volkes. Stuttgart und Tübingen: Verlag der J. G. Cotta'schen Buchhandlung.
- L'examen des dialectes du Vieux Monténegro (Stara Crna Gora) en tenant compte des parles voisins, Bulletin international de l' Académie polonaise des sciences et des letters N 1—3 (janvier-mars), 1–13, Cracovie 1932.
