= Brda (Montenegro) =

Historical region in Montenegro

Brda (Montenegrin Cyrillic: Брда, meaning Highlands or Hills) refers to a historical and ethnographical region in Montenegro. The Brda are one of the country's four historic tribal regions, along with Old Montenegro, Old Herzegovina and the Montenegrin Littoral. The historical tribes of the Brda are the Bjelopavlići, the Piperi, the Rovčani, the Moračani, the Bratonožići, the Kuči and the Vasojevići. Collectively known as "the seven tribes" (Montenegrin: Sedam plemena / Седам племена) or "the seven hills" (Sedmoro brda / Седморо Брда), they were referred to as "Highlander tribes" (Brdska plemena / Брдска племена) before their gradual integration into Montenegro, from the late 18th to the early 20th century (1796–1912). As a result, members of these tribes are also often called "Highlanders" (Brđani / Брђани).

== Geography ==

Today, the Brda region geographically includes the central-eastern, eastern and north-eastern parts of the territory of the highlands in the higher mountainous Montenegro. The territory is approximately 3500 km^{2}, in which ca. 100,000 people live today.

The region includes the northern part of Podgorica with settlements Masline, Zlatica, Zagorič and Rogami, and neighbourhood Spuž, and cities Danilovgrad, Kolašin, Berane and Andrijevica, and also villages such as Bioče, Murina and Mateševo.

== History ==
The Gorska župa ("mountainous county") was mentioned in Stefan the First-Crowned's charter to the Žiča monastery (1220), with the town of Golič. With the Ottoman conquest, parts of the region was organized into the Sanjak of Montenegro (1514–1528) and Sanjak of Scutari.

The burning of Saint Sava's remains after the Banat Uprising provoked the Serbs in other regions to revolt against the Ottomans. In 1596, an uprising broke out in Bjelopavlići, then spread to Drobnjaci, Nikšić, Piva and Gacko (see Serb uprising of 1596–1597). It was suppressed due to lack of foreign support.

Venetian public servant Mariano Bolizza's 1614 report the Kuči, Bratonožići and part of Plava were under the soldiers of Medun, the spahee, but the commander was not named; and the highlanders would pay the Ottoman officials a portion of their income. Between 1614 and 1621 the Kuči were mentioned as Ottoman subjects. In 1658, the seven tribes: Bjelopavlići, Piperi, Rovčani, Moračani, Bratonožići, Kuči and Vasojevići allied themselves with the Republic of Venice, establishing the so-called "Seven-fold barjak" or "alaj-barjak", against the Ottomans.

It is claimed that Süleyman Pasha managed to penetrate into Cetinje only with the help of the Brđani, who were in feud with the Montenegrin tribes. In 1688, the Kuči, with help from Klimenti and Piperi, destroyed the army of Sulejman-paša twice, took over Medun and got their hands of large quantities of weapons and equipment. In 1689, an uprising broke out in Piperi, Rovca, Bjelopavlići, Bratonožići, Kuči and Vasojevići, while at the same time an uprising broke out in Prizren, Peć, Priština and Skopje, and then in Kratovo and Kriva Palanka in October (Karposh's Rebellion). Süleyman entered Cetinje again in 1692, again with the help of the Brđani, and pushed out the Venetians, reasserting his rule over Montenegro which had been under Venetian protection. At that time, the Brđani had little respect of their co-religious tribal neighbours, as plunder was their main income. Plav, Gusinje, and the Orthodox population in those regions suffered the most from the Klimenti's attacks.

In 1774, in the same month of the death of Šćepan Mali, Mehmed Pasha Bushati attacked the Bjelopavlići and Kuči, but was decisively defeated and returned to Scutari.

Documents, especially the letter of Ivan Radonjić from 1789, show that the Montenegrins were identified as Serbs, and that the Banjani, Kuči, Piperi, Bjelopavlići, Zećani, Vasojevići, Bratonožići were not identified as "Montenegrins". They were all mentioned only in a regional, geographical, and tribal manner, and never as an ethnic category.

In 1794, the Kuči and Rovčani were devastated by the Ottomans. In 1796, the Montenegrin army under Metropolitan Petar I Petrović-Njegoš with the assistance of Bjelopavlići and Piperi defeated the Ottoman army at the Battle of Martinići. The Montenegrin victory resulted in territorial expansion, with the tribes of Bjelopavlići and Piperi being joined into the Montenegrin state. The Rovčani, as other highlander tribes, subsequently turned more and more towards the Prince-Bishopric of Montenegro. Metropolitan Petar I sent letters in 1799 to the Moračani and Rovčani, advising them to live peacefully and in solidarity.

During the First Serbian Uprising (1804–1813), the Drobnjaci, Moračani, Rovčani, Uskoci and Pivljani rose against the Ottomans and burnt down villages in Herzegovina. The Rovca and Lower and Upper Morača tribes were incorporated into Montenegro only in 1820, after the defeat of the Ottoman army at the Morača river, and Vasojevići even later, in 1858.

Prince-Bishop Petar I (r. 1782-1830) waged a successful campaign against the bey of Bosnia in 1819; the repulse of an Ottoman invasion from Albania during the Russo-Turkish War (1828–1829) led to the recognition of Montenegrin sovereignty over Piperi. Petar I had managed to unite the Bjelopavlići and Piperi with Montenegro, and when Bjelopavlići and the rest of the Hills (Seven hills) were joined into Peter's state, the polity was officially called "Black Mountain (Montenegro) and the Hills". A civil war broke out in 1847, in which the Piperi, Kuči, Bjelopavlići and Crmnica sought to confront the growing centralized power of new prince of Montenegro; the secessionists were subdued and their ringleaders shot. Amid the Crimean War, there was a political problem in Montenegro; Danilo I's uncle, George, urged for yet another war against the Ottomans, but the Austrians advised Danilo not to take arms. A conspiracy was formed against Danilo, led by his uncles George and Pero, the situation came to its height when the Ottomans stationed troops along the Herzegovinian frontier, provoking the mountaineers. Some urged an attack on Bar, others raided into Herzegovina, and the discontent of Danilo's subjects grew so much that the Piperi, Kuči and Bjelopavlići, the recent and still unamalgamated acquisitions, proclaimed themselves an independent state in July, 1854. In Danilo I's Code, dated to 1855, he explicitly states that he is the "knjaz (prince) and gospodar (lord) of the Free Black Mountain (Montenegro) and the Hills". Danilo was forced to take measurement against the rebels in Brda, some rebels crossed into Ottoman territory and some submitted and were to pay for the civil war they had caused. Knjaz Danilo was assassinated in August, 1860 as he was boarding a ship at the port of Kotor. The assassin, Chief Todor Kadić of the Bjelopavlići, was said to be assisted by Austrian authorities in carrying out the assassination. Some speculate that there was a personal feud between the two, the fact that Danilo had an affair with Todor's sister and the ongoing mistreatment of the Bjelopavlići tribe by Danilo's guards and his forces.

When Bjelopavlići and the rest of the Hills (Seven hills) was joined into the state during the rule of Peter I, it was officially called "Black Mountain (Montenegro) and the Hills". In Danilo I's Code, dated to 1855, he explicitly states that he is the "knjaz (prince) and gospodar (lord) of the Free Black Mountain (Montenegro) and the Hills".

== See also ==
- Old Montenegro
- Old Herzegovina
- Montenegrin Littoral

== Bibliography ==
- Bataković, Dušan T. (1996). The Serbs of Bosnia & Herzegovina: History and Politics. Dialogue Association.
