= Christopher Boehm =

American cultural anthropologist (1931–2021)

Christopher Boehm (1931–2021) was an American cultural anthropologist with a subspecialty in primatology, who researched conflict resolution, altruism, the evolution of morality, and feuding and warfare. He was also the Director of the Jane Goodall Research Center at University of Southern California, a multi-media interactive database focusing on the social and moral behavior of world hunter gatherers. Boehm died on November 23, 2021, at the age of 90.

== Education ==
Boehm received his Ph.D. in social anthropology from Harvard University in 1972, and was later trained in ethological field techniques (1983).

== Work ==
Boehm did field work with human societies such as the Navajo People and the Rovca Tribes of Montenegro or Upper Morača River Tribe, as well as primates such as wild chimpanzees, focusing on questions of morality in an evolutionary context.

After analyzing data from 48 human societies spread across the globe, ranging from small hunting and gathering bands to more sedentary chiefdoms, Boehm suggested that all human societies likely practiced egalitarianism before the domestication of plants and animals, and that most of the time they did so very successfully.

Boehm wrote:

"As long as followers remain vigilantly egalitarian because they understand the nature of domination and leaders remain cognizant of this ambivalence-based vigilance, deliberate control of leaders may remain for the most part highly routinized and ethnographically unobvious."

Boehm identified the following mechanisms ensuring the what he called a "Reverse Dominance Hierarchy": Public Opinion, Criticism and Ridicule, Disobedience, and Extreme Sanctions. Further characteristics include ambivalence towards leaders and anticipation of domination.

In a key article and two influential books, Boehm argues that the equality and sharing among hunter and gatherer bands was culturally and consciously achieved. He says that we retain our ape heritage which encourages us to submit, to compete and to dominate. But for humans to survive we had to agree consciously together to repress the jealousy, aggression and selfishness which welled up in us, and we had to repress selfishness in others.

== Awards ==
Boehm won the Stirling Prize in Psychological Anthropology, and was a recipient of a John Simon Guggenheim Fellowship and a fellowship at the School of Advanced Research in Santa Fe, New Mexico.

== Publications ==
=== Bibliography ===
- Boehm, Christopher (2014). "The moral consequences of social selection". Behaviour. 151 (2–3). Brill Publishers: 167–183. doi:10.1163/1568539X-00003143.
- Boehm, Christopher (2012). Moral Origins: Social Selection and the Evolution of Virtue, Altruism, and Shame. New York: Basic Books. ISBN 978-0465020485.
- Boehm, Christopher (1999). "The Natural Selection of Altruistic Traits" (PDF). Human Nature. 10 (3). Springer Science+Business Media: 205–252. doi:10.1007/s12110-999-1003-z. PMID 26196335. S2CID 207392341.
- Boehm, Christopher (2001) [1999]. Hierarchy in the Forest: The Evolution of Egalitarian Behavior (Revised ed.). Cambridge, MA: Harvard University Press. ISBN 978-0674006911.
- Boehm, C. (1986). Blood Revenge: The Enactment and Management of Conflict in Montenegro and Other Tribal Societies. Philadelphia: University of Pennsylvania Press. [1984 book reprinted with revisions and new title].
- Boehm, C. (1983). Montenegrin Social Organization and Values: Political Ethnography of a Refuge Area Tribal Adaptation. New York: AMS Press.

== See also ==
- Evolution of morality
- Political anthropology
- Primatology
- Evolutionary anthropology
- Evolutionary psychology
- Sociobiology
