= Battle of Murino =

1880 battle

- Part of Battles for Plav and Gusinje
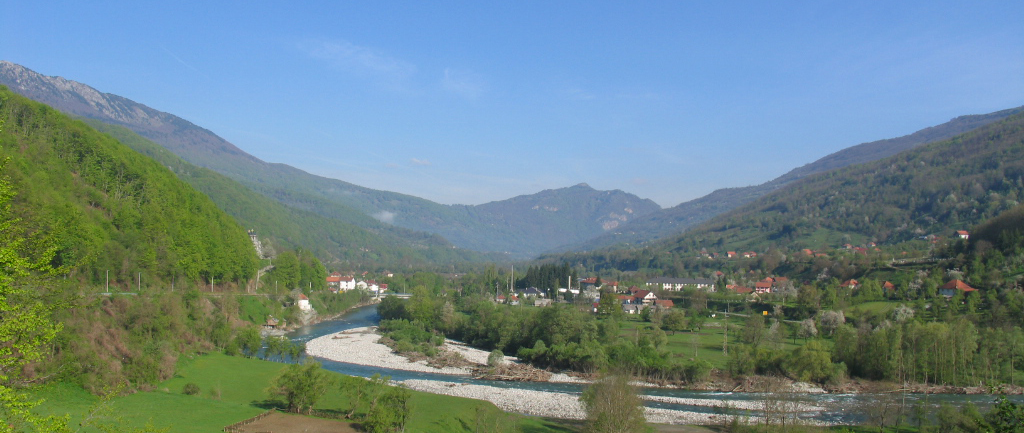
- Murino in May 2011
Date	January 8, 1880
Location	Velika, Plav, Montenegro 42.656833°N 19.876166°E
Result	Both sides claim victory: Montenegrin Withdrawal; Burning of Vasojevići settlements by Albanian irregulars

Belligerents
Montenegro	League of Prizren

Commanders and leaders
Marko Miljanov; Todor Miljanov priest Đoko	Kurt Asllani; Nure Kurti

Units involved
Bratonožići battalion; Vasojevići battalion; Moračani battalion	League of Prizren

Strength
3,000 (Montenegrin claim); 9,000 (Albanian claim)	7,000 (Albanian claim); 10,000 (Montenegrin claim)

Casualties and losses
Unknown; 1,200 (Albanian claim)	At least 349
- Location within modern-day Montenegro

The Battle of Murino (Albanian: Beteja e Murinës) took place on January 8, 1880, between the Principality of Montenegro and the League of Prizren. It was part of the battles about the sovereignty over Plav (Albanian: Plavë) and Gusinje (Albanian: Guci). According to the treaty of Berlin, the Ottoman Empire was to hand over the region to Montenegro, but this move was militarily opposed by local Albanians. At the time of the battle, Montenegrin sources claim that around 10,000 Albanians from the League of Prizren fought against Montenegrin forces numbering 3,000, led by commanders Marko Miljanov and Todor Miljanov and priest Đoko, in Murino. Albanian sources claim that around 4,000 Albanian soldiers of the League of Prizren and 3,000 local volunteers fought against 9,000 Montenegrins.

The battle at Murino occurred about a month later after the battle of Novšiće (December 4, 1879) as the Ottoman high command was preparing to send troops from Monastir under Ahmed Muhtar Pasha to pacify local resistance to the annexation. The Montenegrin forces moved from Pepići against the positions in Metej, near Plava when they were intercepted by the League of Prizren. After the skirmish, the Montenegrin forces withdrew to Sutjeska, near Andrijevica and Albanian irregulars burned down the Vasojevići settlements, Velika, Ržanica and Pepići. Both sides after the battle claimed victory. In Montenegro, Prince Nicholas claimed that the defeat of the Albanians was so devastating, that Montenegrin forces finished the battle before the night had fallen, which is something they usually don't do. Right after the battle of Murino, Marko Miljanov received a report that Albanians were boasting for keeping Plav and Gusinje, not for the battles they fought with the Montenegrins. Some reports say that Montenegrin soldiers brought 221 noses they cut from the dead bodies of Ottoman Albanian irregulars.

== Sources ==
- Vuković, Gavro; Tomović, Slobodan (1996). Memoari vojvode Gavra Vukovića. Obod. ISBN 978-86-305-0260-6.
- Istorijski institut u Titogradu (1982). Istorijski zapisi. Istorijski institut u Titogradu. p. 66.
- King Nikola I (1969). Cjelokupna djela. p. 567.
- Ippen, Theodor Anton (1916), Illyrisch-albanische forschungen (in German), München, Leipzig: Duncker & Humblot, OCLC 35691167
