= Velika attacks (1879) =

1879 battle of the Battles for Plav and Gusinje

- Part of Battles for Plav and Gusinje
Date	October 9 – November 22, 1879
Location	Velika, Plav, Principality of Montenegro 42.6644°N 19.9561°E
Result	First Attack: Montenegrin victory Second Attack: Albanian victory

Belligerents
Principality of Montenegro	League of Prizren

Units involved
(Principality of Montenegro) Moračani battalion; (Principality of Montenegro) Bratonožići battalion	Albanian irregulars
- Location within modern-day Montenegro

The Velika attacks were a series of attacks during the Congress of Berlin carried out by Albanian irregulars.

== Background ==
According to the decisions of the Berlin Congress, the territories of Plav and Gusinje (then part of the Scutari Vilayet of the Ottoman Empire) were awarded to Montenegro. Still, the Ottomans did not provide conditions for Montenegro to take over Plav and Gusinje. Officially, they intended to respect the decisions of the Congress, but in reality the Ottomans supported the League of Prizren they had established, also to avoid the fulfilment of the obligations they undertook at the Berlin Congress. The Ottoman governor of Scutari sent ammunition to the local Muslim population of Gusinje in order for them to resist Montenegro.

== Prelude ==
Until October 1879, Montenegrin forces were able to march into Gusinje without resistance. When Montenegro prepared forces for such an expedition, the Ottomans intervened with the Great Powers to stop it, under the excuse of avoiding eventual conflicts. The Ottoman military officer Muhtar Pasha arrived at Prizren in November 1879, where he had 15 battalions. The Ottomans informed Montenegro that those forces would only be used to provide the peaceful transfer of Plav and Gusinje to Montenegro, which demobilized some of its forces based on this information. In the meantime, around 15,000 Albanian irregulars gathered in Gusinje. The British Ambassador at Istanbul, A. H. Layard, informed his government that the Porte did nothing to prevent the influx of armed bands into the Gusinje region, and emphasized that the Porte would be held responsible for the consequences.

Historian Milovan Đilas emphasized that the northern Albanian tribes had territorial aspirations for the fertile plain along the river Lim in Plav and Gusinje. After the Berlin Congress, their aim was to descend into the valley before the official institutions of Montenegro grasped firm control over it.

== Aftermath ==
=== Battle of Murino ===
The battle at Murino occurred about a month later after the battle of Novšiće (December 4, 1879) as the Ottoman high command was preparing to send troops from Monastir under Ahmed Muhtar Pasha in order to pacify local resistance to the annexation. The Montenegrin forces moved from Pepići against the positions in Meteh, near Plav when they were intercepted by the League of Prizren. After the skirmish, the Montenegrin forces withdrew to Sutjeska, near Andrijevica and Albanian irregulars burned down the Vasojevići settlements of Velika, Ržanica and Pepići. Both sides after the battle claimed victory.
