= Tihomir Đorđević =

Serbian ethnologist, folklorist, and historian

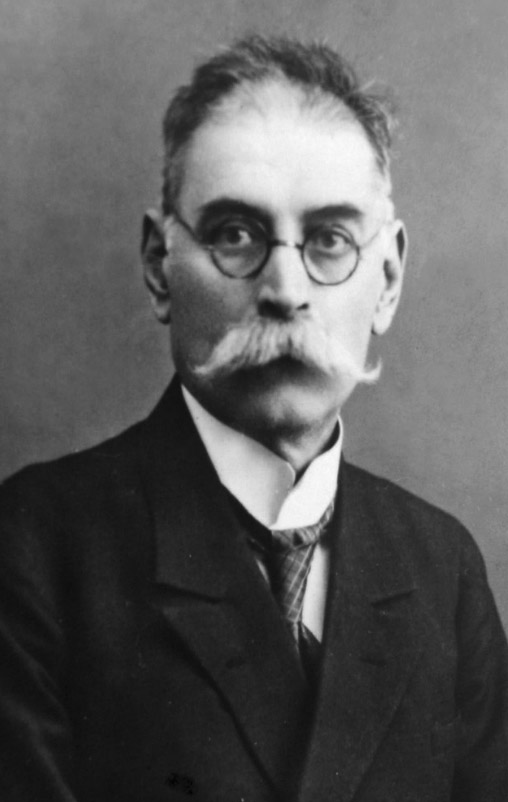
Tihomir Đorđević

Tihomir Đorđević (Knjaževac, Principality of Serbia, 19 February 1868 — Belgrade, Kingdom of Yugoslavia, 28 May 1944) was a Serbian ethnologist, folklorist, cultural historian and professor at the University of Belgrade.

== Biography ==
He received his B.A. in History and Philology at the Velika škola in Belgrade. He pursued his post-graduate studies in Vienna and Munich, where he received his doctorate in 1902. Among the Munich alumnae were Miloje Vasić, Veselin Čajkanović and Dragutin Anastasijević, his contemporaries.

Đorđević's interests were very wide and varied, ranging from detailed analyzes of the folklife of Serbs through ethnographic research of the lives of other peoples in Serbia (Romani people, Timok Romanians/Vlachs, Aromanians, Greeks, Circassians, etc.) to folklore and sociological studies not only of Serbia, but also of the Balkan people in general.

Although not an anthropologist, he is the first Serbian scientist who explicitly pointed to the importance of paleoanthropology for history and ethnology. In 1908, while researching at the unknown cemetery in Žagubica, he demonstrated that old cemeteries, necropolises, are primary sources for data for many scientific disciplines. In his book Đorđević emphasized that the data, obtained through the study of skeletons and graves, represent the only source of material, appearance and way of life of a people in the past when written records are lacking.

He was elected a correspondent member of the Serbian Academy of Sciences and Arts on 19 February 1921, and regular member on 16 February 1937.

== Major works ==
Macedonia, London, Allen & Unwin, 1918

- The Truth Concerning the Rumanes in Serbia, Paris, Impremèrie Graphique, 1919
- Macedonia, London, Allen & Unwin, 1918
- From Serbia, Prince Miloš, I-II, 1922–1924
- Gypsies in Serbia, a doctoral dissertation
- Our National Life, Volumes I-X

== See also ==
- Sima Trojanović
- Jovan Erdeljanović
- Ljubomir Davidović
