= Sima Trojanović =

Serbian anthropologist and academic (1862–1935)

Sima Trojanović (2 February 1862 – 21 November 1935) was a Serbian ethnologist and the first university-trained anthropologist, director of the Ethnographic Museum, Belgrade, university professor in Skopje and member of the Serbian Academy of Sciences and Arts.

== Biography ==
Sima Trojanović was born in Šabac in 1862 to a merchant family. His father was originally from Bitola, and his mother from Srem. He finished high school in Šabac and Vinkovci. He graduated from universities in Switzerland and in Germany, where he studied natural sciences. He defended his doctoral dissertation at the University of Heidelberg on 4 August 1885, majoring in biology and anthropology.

He started working as a teacher of German in a Grammar School in Čačak in 1886. After that he moved to Loznica, and from 1894 taught there at a gymnasium. In 1898 he received government travel stipend to study ethnology and physical anthropology in Vienna, Munich and Prague for two years. When he returned in 1901, he was named director of the newly-founded Ethnographic Museum in Belgrade. Like most European museums of the time, Trojanović exhibited ethnological treasures in a rather aestheticizing way, and its policy was under the influence of national politics of that time.

In the world exhibitions that the museum participated in, the material was selected by Sima Trojanović. He was a curator and manager of Belgrade's Ethnographic Museum until 1921 when he was appointed full professor of ethnography at the Faculty of Philosophy in Skopje.

Works by Sima Trojanović have had lasting value for Serbian anthropology.

He was first elected a corresponding member of the Serbian Royal Academy on 19 February 1921.

== See also ==
- Jovan Erdeljanović
- Tihomir Đorđević
- Ljubomir Davidović
