= Rovčani =

Historical tribe of Montenegro

The Rovčani (Serbian Cyrillic: Ровчани, pronounced [rǒ̞ʋt͡ʃani]) are a historical tribe of Montenegro and one of the seven highlander tribes of the Brda region, alongside the Bjelopavlići, Piperi, Kuči, Bratonožići, Moračani and Vasojevići. The historical region that they inhabit is called Rovca (Serbian Cyrillic: Ровца, pronounced [rǒ̞ʋt͡za]).

== Etymology ==
The Rovčani owe their name to the region that they inhabit, called Rovca, which is derived from Slavic rov, meaning “dent” or “trench”.

== Geography ==
Rovca borders the historical regions and tribes of the Moračani to the east, the Drobnjaci to the north, the Nikšići to the west, the Bjelopavlići to the southwest, the Piperi to the south, and the Bratonožići to the southeast. Rovca consists of the following villages: Višnje, Velje Duboko, Liješnje, Cerovica, Međuriječje, Mrtvo Duboko, Sreteška Gora, Gornja Rovca, Vlahovići and Trmanje.

== History ==
The region of Rovca is first mentioned in the 1477 defter (tax registry) of the Sanjak of Herzegovina, which had been established in 1470.

Mariano Bolizza, a Venetian patrician, recorded in 1614 that “Riouzi” (Rovci) was inhabited by Orthodox Christian Serbs and had a total of 50 houses. The 120 men-at-arms were commanded by Ivan Rodonjin. In 1689, an uprising broke out in Piperi, Rovca, Bjelopavlići, Bratonožići, Kuči and Vasojevići. This uprising broke out at the same time of a similar one in Prizren, Peć, Priština and Skopje, which expanded further in Kratovo and Kriva Palanka in October (Karposh's Rebellion).

In 1768, the Rovčani helped the Bjelopavlići, who were attacked by the Ottomans. In 1774, Mehmet Bushatli, the pasha of Scutari, broke into Kuči and "destroyed" it; the Rovčani housed and protected some of the refugee families. On the request of Russian Empress Catherine, the Montenegrins and Herzegovinians took arms against the Ottomans in 1788. The call was gladly accepted by the Rovčani and Moračani who equipped gunpowder and weapons for the upcoming events. However, the Ottomans heard of the intentions, and preemptively struck Morača, the centre of preparation. In 1794, the Kuči and Rovčani were devastated by the Ottomans. In 1796, the Montenegrin army under Metropolitan Petar I Petrović-Njegoš and with the assistance of the Bjelopavlići and Piperi, defeated the Ottoman army at the Battle of Krusi. The Montenegrin victory resulted in territorial expansion, with the tribes of Bjelopavlići and Piperi being joined into the Montenegrin state. The Rovčani, as other highlander tribes, subsequently turned more and more towards Montenegro. Metropolitan Petar I sent letters in 1799 to the Moračani and Rovčani, advising them to live peacefully and in solidarity.

During the First Serbian Uprising (1804–13), the Drobnjaci, Moračani, Rovčani, Uskoci and Pivljani rose against the Ottomans and burnt down villages in Herzegovina. In 1820, after the defeat of the Ottoman army at the Morača river, the Rovčani were incorporated into Montenegro, together with the Moračani.

Rovčani was one of the tribes that supported the Montenegrin Greens, a faction that opposed what they saw was an annexation of Montenegro to Serbia and instead urged for a federation. The Greens still declared themselves to be ethnic Serbs. During the Christmas Uprising (January 7, 1919) two members of Bulatović family were flayed alive in Rovca by the Montenegrin Whites (the other political faction).

== Politics ==
The Rovčani tribe had historically viewed themselves as Serbs, and in light of Montenegrin independence (2006), Rovca clan chief Nikola Minić said that "If Milo Djukanovic tried to divide Montenegro... we wouldn't live in his country... but remain united in a brotherhood with Serbia."

== Anthropology ==
According to local folklore, recalled by a Bulatović, the Rovca tribe ultimately descend from ban (duke) Ilijan, from Grbalj in the Bay of Kotor. This Ilijan allegedly married Jevrosima, the daughter of Grand Prince Vukan (r. 1202–04) and sister of Stefan Vukanović Nemanjić, who built the Morača monastery. Ilijan had a son, Nikša, who was in conflict with ban Ugren of the Nikšić župa (county). Nikša's son Gojak murdered Ugren, after which he was hid in the Morača monastery by his great-uncle (or uncle) Stefan, and then in the Lukavica mountain, where he is believed to have died. Gojak had fours sons: Bulat (whose descendants are known as Bulatovići), Šćepan (whose descendants are known as Šćepanovići), Vlaho (whose descendants are known as Vlahovići) and Srezoje (whose descendants are known as Srezojevići).

The other part of Rovčani are descendants of knez (duke) Bogdan Lješnjanin, who fled from Čevo due to a blood feud, and firstly settled in the village of Liješnje in the Lješ nahiyah (subdistrict), and then after another blood feud there he settled in what would become Rovca, in the village of Brezno (which today is known as Liješnje). This happened in the first half of the 15th century, before the Ottoman conquest.

All of the Rovca tribe celebrate the Slava, St. Luke.

=== Brotherhoods ===
- Rovca
  - Bulatovići
  - Šćepanovići
  - Vlahovići
  - Srezojevići
- Bogdanovići

== Notable people ==
- Hajduk Veljko Petrović, hero of the First Serbian Uprising; by ancestry
- Pavle Bulatović, former Yugoslav Minister of Interior; by ancestry
- Predrag Bulatović, Montenegrin politician; by ancestry
- Miodrag Bulatović, Serbian and Montenegrin novelist and playwright; by ancestry
- Katarina Bulatović, Montenegrin handball player; by ancestry
- Anđela Bulatović, Montenegrin handball player; by ancestry
- Ivana Bulatović, Montenegrin alpine skier; by ancestry
- Nikola Bulatović, retired Serbian and Montenegrin basketball player; by ancestry
- Veljko Vlahović, Montenegrin communist politician
- Miodrag Vlahović, Montenegrin politician and communist; by ancestry
- Miodrag Vlahović (foreign minister), former Montenegrin ambassador to the U.S.; by ancestry
- Veselin Vlahović, Montenegrin war criminal; by ancestry
- Matija Bećković, famous Serbian writer and poet; by ancestry
- Vlado Šćepanović, retired Montenegrin basketball player; born in Kolašin, by ancestry
- Nebojša Bogavac, retired Montenegrin basketball player; by ancestry
- Dragan Bogavac, Montenegrin football player; by ancestry
- Avdo Međedović, Montenegrin Muslim guslar and oral poet; by ancestry
- Mato Pižurica, Serbian linguist and professor
- Vojislav Šešelj, Bosnian Serb nationalist politician, writer and lawyer; by ancestry

== Sources ==
- Banac, Ivo (1988) [1st pub. 1984]. The National Question in Yugoslavia: Origins, History, Politics. Ithaca and London: Cornell University Press. ISBN 978-0-8014-9493-2.
- Barjaktarović, Mirko (1984). Rovca (etnološka monografija). Titograd: Crnogorska akademija nauka i umjetnosti.
- Elsie, Robert, ed. (2003). "Mariano Bolizza: Report and description of the Sanjak of Shkodra 1614". Early Albania. A Reader of Historical Texts. Wiesbaden: Otto Harrassowitz Verlag.
- Morrison, Kenneth (2009). Montenegro: A Modern History. London: I.B. Tauris. ISBN 978-1-4416-2897-8.
- Vojislav M. Bulatović; Momir P. Bulatović; Petar J. Marković; Jovan V. Babović; Branko M. Bulatović; Marko V. Bulatović (2004). Rovca: bratstvo Bulatovići : životni put roda mog. M. V. Bulatović. ISBN 978-86-905639-0-6.
