= Bjelopavlići =

Historical tribe and valley in Montenegro

Coordinates: 42°39′N 19°01′E

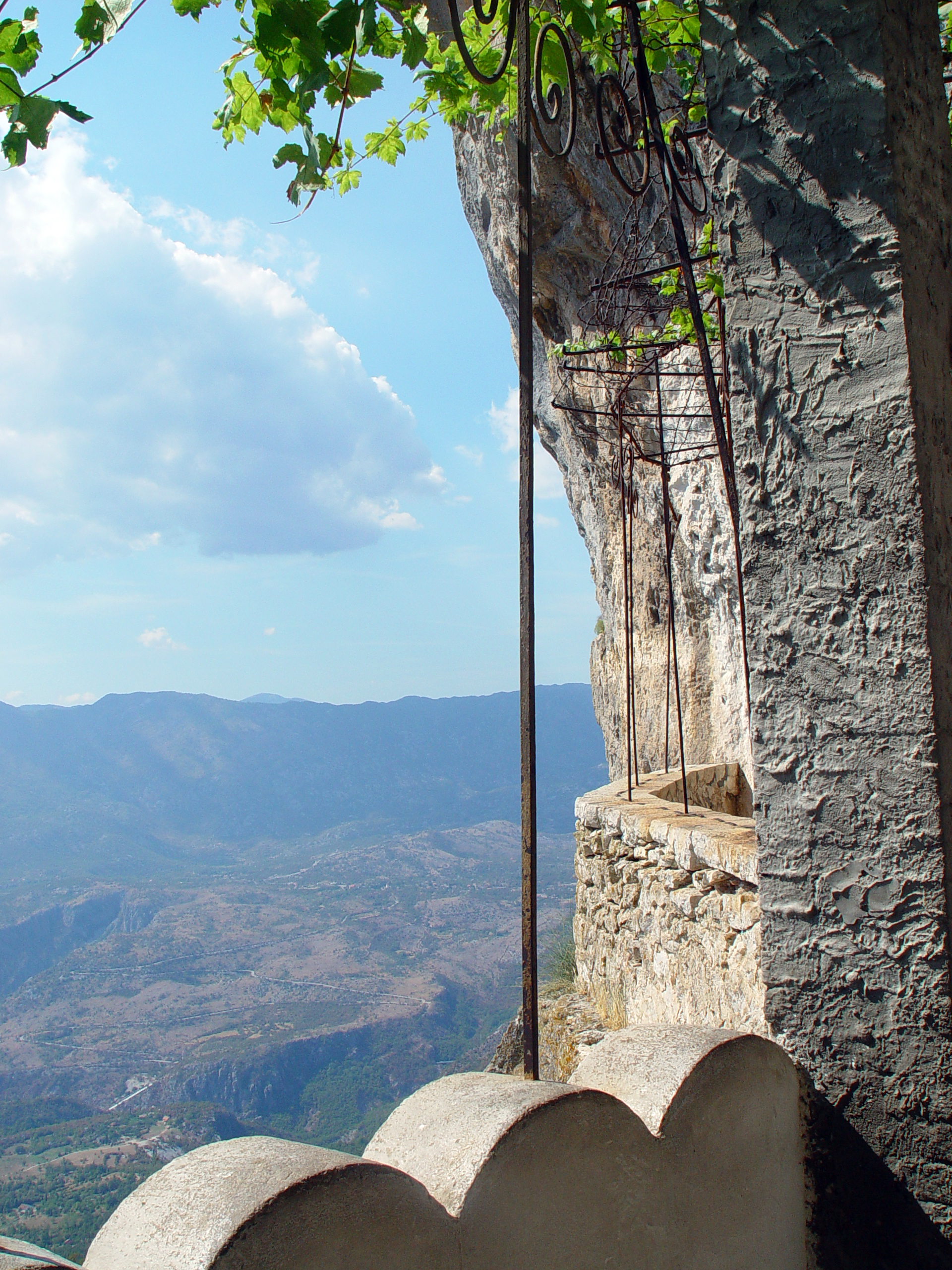
View from Ostrog monastery to Bjelopavlići plain

Bjelopavlići (Cyrillic: Бјелопавлићи, Albanian: Palabardhi; pronounced [bjɛlɔ̌paːv̞lit͡ɕi]) is a historical tribe (pleme) of Albanian origin and a valley in the region of the Brda, in Montenegro, around the city of Danilovgrad.

== Geography ==
The Bjelopavlići valley (also known as the Zeta river valley) is a strip of fertile lowland stretching along the Zeta river, being wider in the river's lower end, down to the confluence with Morača river near Podgorica. The valley has historically been densely populated, as fertile lowlands are rare in mountainous Montenegro, and it provided a corridor for road and rail connection between the two biggest Montenegrin cities, Podgorica and Nikšić. The largest settlement in the plain is the town of Danilovgrad which got name by Prince (Knjaz) Danilo Petrović. Confusingly, the other significant plain in Montenegro, Zeta plain has been named after Zeta river, although Zeta river itself does not flow through it.

== Name ==
The name derives from the semi-mythical progenitor of the tribe known as Bijeli Pavle (lit. 'White Paul') in Slavic. The name corresponds to Palabardhi (i.e. Pal Bardhi) with the exact same meaning in Albanian, which is attested in a 17th-century Venetian document, where the Bjelopavlići are recorded as Palabardi. The Bjelopavlići are known as Dukađinci (from Dukagjin) among the Lužani who were the local Slavic-speakers of the Danilovgrad plain before the settlements of the Bjelopavlići in the region.

== Oral traditions ==
There are several versions of similar oral traditions and folk stories which recorded since the late 19th century about the Bjelopavlići and their common progenitor. There is no actual recorded historical information about any such figure. According to an oral tradition recorded by Špiro Kulišić, the Bjelopavlići claim to descend from a son of the medieval Albanian noble Lekë Dukagjini named Pal Bardhi (Bjelo Pavle). The tradition further claims kinship with the Gashi who are depicted as the descendants of Pal's brother, Gash or Gavrilo. However, according to an alternate tradition, Lekë Dukagjini fathered two sons: Nikolla from whom the Mirdita and Shala descend, and Pal Bardhi from whom the Bjelopavlići and Gashi stem. Another similar folk tradition considers their progenitor to be a Bijeli Pavle who was the son of a Kapetan Leka who moved to Montenegro from Dukagjini (western Kosovo) in the 15th century after the Ottoman conquest. There is no record in oral traditions about his ethnic origins (Serb or Albanian).

Further hypothetical constructions in the 19th century linked him to a Serb origin, corresponding either to the 9th-century Beli Pavlimir mentioned in the Chronicle of the Priest of Duklja, or to a later person from the 13th century, related to the house of Nemanjić, while others linked him to an Albanian origin. Among Albanians from Metohija, it is believed his real name was Pal Bardhi and that he was the son of Lekë Dukagjini.

== Origins ==
Originally an Albanian tribe, the Bjelopavlići underwent a process of gradual cultural integration into the neighbouring Slavic population. A Franciscan report of the 17th century illustrates the final stages of their acculturation. Its author writes that the Bratonožići, Piperi, Bjelopavlići and Kuči:

nulla di meno essegno quasi tutti del rito serviano, e di lingua Illrica ponno piu presto dirsi Schiavoni, ch' Albanesi

Since almost all of them use the Serbian rite and the Illyrian (South Slavic) language, soon they should be called Slavs, rather than Albanians.

== History ==
The first reference to the Bjelopavlići comes from a letter issued by the Serbian Chancellery in Dubrovnik in 1411. The document, a complaint from Ragusan people addressed to Jelena Balšić, is about the looting committed by the Bjelopavlići, together with the Ozrinići, Maznice and Malonšići, on Ragusan merchants on their way through Zeta while they were returning from Serbia.

Following the Ottoman conquest of Upper Zeta in 1474 and the subsequent fall of Scutari in 1479, the Bjelopavlići are mentioned as a distinct nahiyah in the 1485 defter of the newly created Sanjak of Scutari. Their area then consisted of 3 settlements numbering a total of 159 households: Martinići (35 households), Dimitrovići (95) and Vražnegrnci (29). The anthroponymy recorded in the nahiyah of Bjelopavlići predominantly belonged to the Slavic onomastic sphere, although a minority of household heads bore Albanian or mixed Albanian-Slavic personal names. Unlike in many of the other northernmost nahiyahs of the Sanjak of Scutari in Montenegro where Slavic anthroponymy predominated, a minority of the households heads from the nahiyah of Bjelopavlići still bore Albanian anthroponyms in the subsequent registers of the 16th century. Based on the archival material, Selami Pulaha considered regions such as Bjelopavlići to be zones of ethno-linguistic contact between Albanian and Slavic-speaking groups during the medieval period. In 1496, the Ottomans definitely incorporated Zeta into their Empire.

The burning of Saint Sava's remains after the Banat Uprising provoked the Serbs in other regions to revolt against the Ottomans. In 1596, an uprising broke out in the Bjelopavlići plain, then spread to Drobnjaci, Nikšić, Piva and Gacko (see Serb Uprising of 1596–97). It was suppressed due to lack of foreign support.

In 1612 the Sultan sent the son of Mehmet Pasha to Podgorica to tackle the uprisings by the people. The Pasha remained in Podgorica for three months and then decided to ravage the Bjelopavlići, taking 80 women and children as slaves, setting the village on fire and stealing animals. The males were hiding in other villages and upon the department of the Ottoman soldiers, the tribesmen attacked and killed 300 sipahis with their horses and baggage stolen. In 1613, the Ottomans launched a campaign against the rebel tribes of Montenegro. In response, the Bjelopavlići along with the tribes of Kuči, Piperi, Vasojevići, Kastrati, Kelmendi, Shkreli and Hoti formed a political and military union known as or “The Union of the Mountains” or “The Albanian Mountains”. In their shared assemblies, such as the Convention of Kuçi, the leaders swore an oath of besa to resist with all their might any upcoming Ottoman expeditions, thereby protecting their self-government and disallowing the establishment of the authority of the Ottoman Spahis in the northern highlands ever again. They reached an agreement with the rebels for 1,000 ducats and 12 slaves. Venetian Mariano Bolizza (fl. May 1614) recorded that the region was under the command of the Ottoman army in Podgorica. There was 800 armed men of Bjelopavlići (Italian: Biellopaulichi), commanded by Neneca Latinović and Bratič Tomašević. Later that year, the Bjelopavlići, Kuči, Piperi, and Kelmendi sent a letter to the kings of Spain and France claiming they were independent from Ottoman rule and did not pay tribute to the empire. When the Pasha of Herzegovina attack city of Kotor 1657, the tribes of the Kelmendi and Bjelopavlići also participated in this battle on the side of the Venetians. Kotor repulsed the siege, but their rebellion against the Ottomans was suppressed shortly afterwards.

The Bjelopavlići are recorded in an Ottoman historical report of Mustafa Naima as among the Albanian communities which rose in rebellion against the Ottoman authorities between 1637-8. According to the report, the Bjelopavlići and Piperi had first submitted and provided sustenance to the Ottoman forces under Vučo Mehmed Pasha on his campaign against the Kelmendi, although the latter later rose again in rebellion. The population of the nahiyah of Bjelopavlići is described in the report as Albanian.

In 1774, in the same month of the death of Šćepan Mali, Mehmed Pasha Bushati attacked the Kuči and Bjelopavlići, but was decisively defeated and returned to Scutari. Prince-Bishop Petar I (r. 1782-1830) waged a successful campaign against the bey of Bosnia in 1819; the repulse of an Ottoman invasion from Albania during the Russo-Turkish War (1828–29) led to the recognition of Montenegrin sovereignty over Piperi. Petar I had managed to unite the Piperi and Bjelopavlići with Montenegro, and when Bjelopavlići and the rest of the Hills (Seven hills) were joined into Peter's state, a polity officially called "Black Mountain (Montenegro) and the Hills". A civil war broke out in 1847, in which the Piperi, Kuči, Bjelopavlići and Crmnica sought to confront the growing centralized power of new prince of Montenegro; the secessionists were subdued and their ringleaders shot. Amid the Crimean War, there was a political problem in Montenegro; Danilo I's uncle, George, urged for yet another war against the Ottomans, but the Austrians advised Danilo not to take arms. A conspiracy was formed against Danilo, led by his uncles George and Pero, the situation came to its height when the Ottomans stationed troops along the Herzegovinian frontier, provoking the mountaineers. Some urged an attack on Bar, others raided into Herzegovina, and the discontent of Danilo's subjects grew so much that the Piperi, Kuči and Bjelopavlići, the recent and still unamalgamated acquisitions, proclaimed themselves an independent state in July, 1854. In Danilo I's Code, dated to 1855, he explicitly states that he is the "knjaz (duke, prince) and gospodar (lord) of the Free Black Mountain (Montenegro) and the Hills". Danilo was forced to take measurement against the rebels in Brda, some rebels crossed into Ottoman territory and some submitted and were to pay for the civil war they had caused. Knjaz Danilo was assassinated in August, 1860 as he was boarding a ship at the port of Kotor. The assassin, Chief Todor Kadić of the Bjelopavlići, was said to be assisted by Austrian authorities in carrying out the assassination. Some speculate that there was a personal feud between the two, the fact that Danilo had an affair with Todor's wife and the ongoing mistreatment of the Bjelopavlići tribe by Danilo's guards and his forces.

During the rule of Nikola I Petrović-Njegoš, the Bjelopavlići had bad relations with the prince, which deteriorated further after 1908 when a prominent member of the tribe, Andrija Radović, was sentenced to 15 years in prison during the Cetinje bombing trial.

Although a tribe of the Brda, the Bjelopavlići were among the first in the area to become subjects of the Prince-Bishop of Montenegro at the end of the 18th century, hence their strong support for the independence of the country in 2006.

== Families and notable people ==
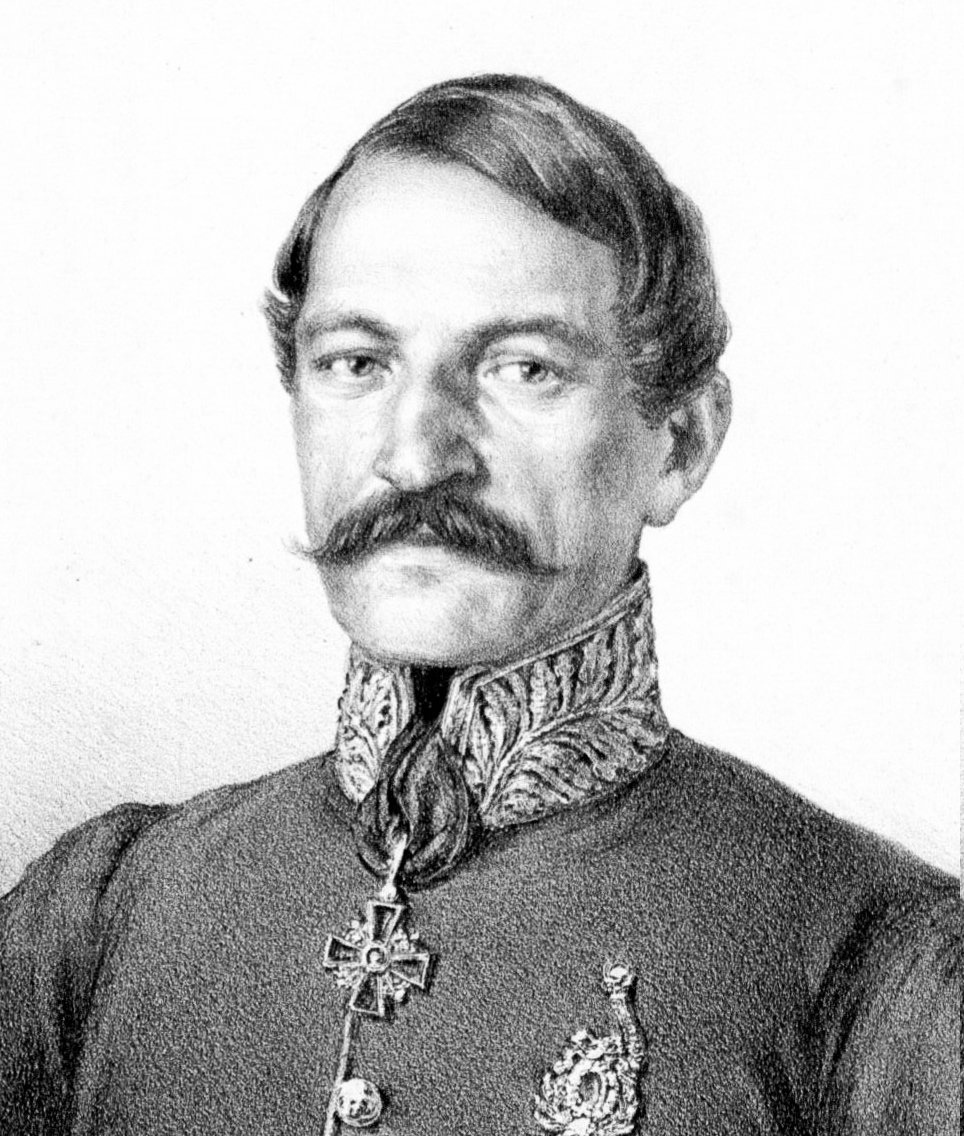
Ilija Garašanin

All families have the slava of Parascheva of the Balkans (sv. Petka).

Brotherhoods

- Vražegrmci and Martinići, descend from Buba Šćepanović
- Pavkovići, descend from Pavko Mitrović
  - Brajović, descend from Brajo Pavković
- Petrušinovići, descend from Petar Mitrović
- Matijaševići and Tomaševići, descend from Nikola Mitrović
- Kalezići, descend from Kaleta Mitrović
- Lužani, natives

Notable people born or with descent from Bjelopavlići include:

- Ilija Garašanin, Serbian statesman, Prime Minister, Defender of the Constitution, creator of the Načertanije.
- Veselin Đuranović, Yugoslav communist politician.
- Milutin Garašanin, Serbian politician who held the post of Prime Minister of Serbia.
- Dragan Jočić, former Minister of Internal Affairs of Serbia.
- Jovica Stanišić, head of the State Security Service (SDB) within the Ministry of Internal Affairs of Serbia.
- Andrija Radović, politician and statesmen.
- Blagoje Jovović, member of the Partisan and later the Chetnik movement.
- Vasos Mavrovouniotis, Montenegrin general in the Greek revolution.
- Milutin Savić, Serbian revolutionary.
- Bajo Stanišić, officer of the Royal Yugoslav Army.
- Zorica Pavićević, Yugoslav handball player, competed in the 1984 Summer Olympics.
- Vojislav Brajović, Serbian actor.
- Zoran Kalezić, Montenegrin singer.
- Borislav Jovanović, writer, poet and literary critic.
- Arso Milatović, diplomat, Yugoslav ambassador in Albania, Romania and Poland
