= Morača (tribe) =

Historical tribe and region of Montenegro

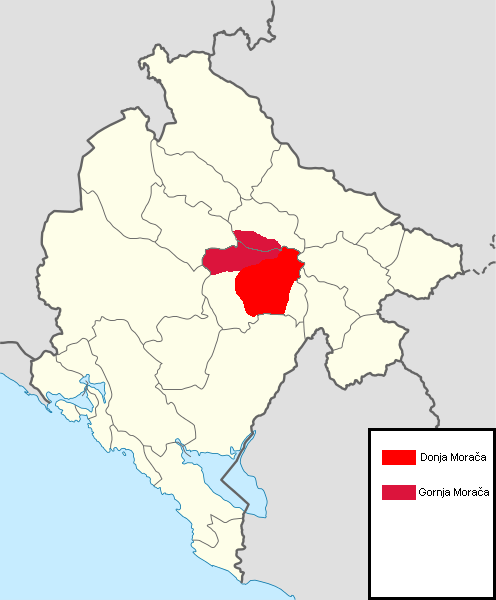
This is the map of Gornja Morača(Upper Morača) and Donja Morača(Lower Morača).

The Moračani (Serbian Cyrillic: Морачани) are one of the historical Serbian tribes of Montenegro and one of the seven highlander tribes from the Brda region. According to folklore, their founder was Bogić Moračanin (16th century), hence they also call themselves Bogićevci. The region that they occupy is called Morača.

== Geography ==
To the east is the tribe of Vasojevići, to the south the Piperi and Bratonožići, to the west the Rovčani, to the northwest the Uskoci and north the Šaranci.

== Notable people ==
- Gavrilo Dožić
- Mihailo Janketić
- Mihailo Dožić
- Amfilohije Radović
- Andrija Mandić
- Miodrag Perović
- Andrija Milošević
- Vojin Ćetković
- Danijel Furtula
- Igor Rakočević

== Sources ==
- Раосављевић, Рајко. Морача, Ровца, Колашин.
