= Old Herzegovina =

Historical region in parts of present-day Herzegovina, Montenegro, and Serbia

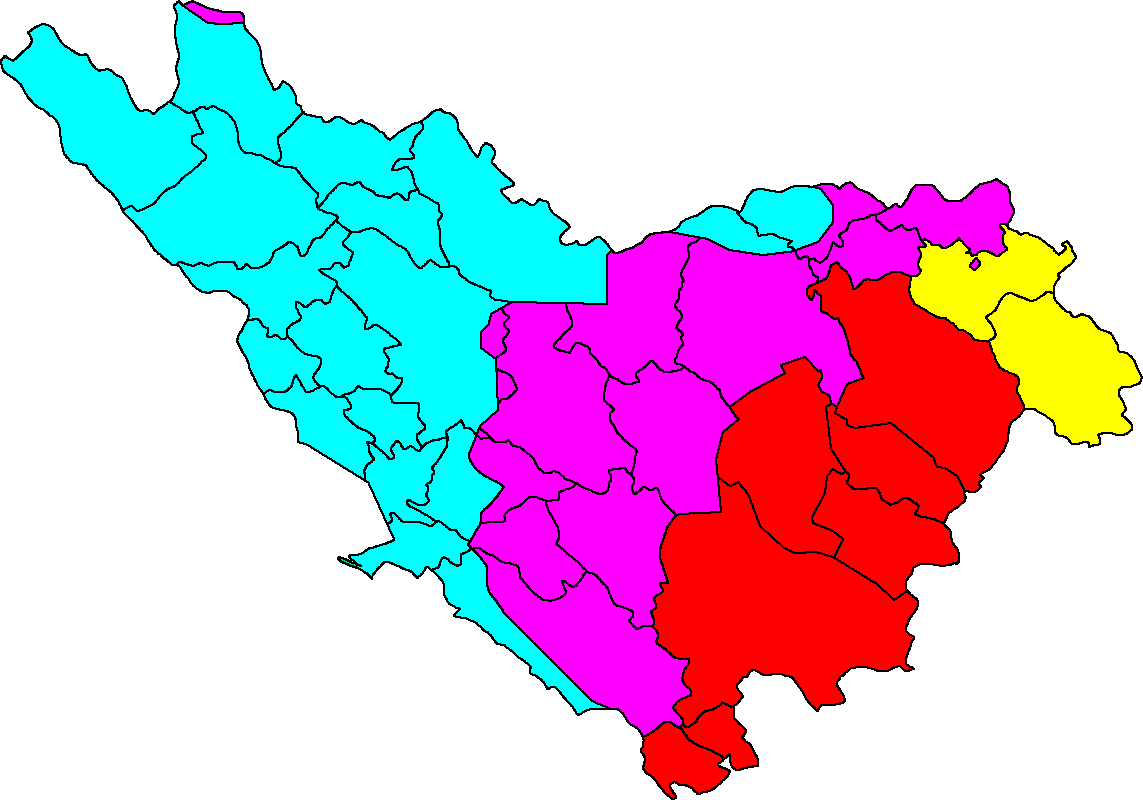
Historical Herzegovina within borders of modern states, including the Old Herzegovina, in Montenegro (red) and Serbia (yellow)

Old Herzegovina (Serbo-Croatian: Stara Hercegovina, Стара Херцеговина) is a historical region, covering the eastern parts of historical Herzegovina, outside the scope of modern Herzegovina. A large section of Old Herzegovina belongs to modern Montenegro, while a smaller section belongs to the modern Bosnia and Herzegovina and modern Serbia. All of those regions were parts of historical Herzegovina from the middle of the 15th century until 1878.

In modern Montenegro, the region includes the municipal areas of Herceg Novi, Nikšić, Pljevlja, Plužine, Šavnik and Žabljak. In modern Bosnia and Herzegovina, the region includes the municipal areas of Čajniče, Foča, Kalinovik and Rudo. In modern Serbia, the region includes the municipal areas of Priboj and Prijepolje.

== History ==
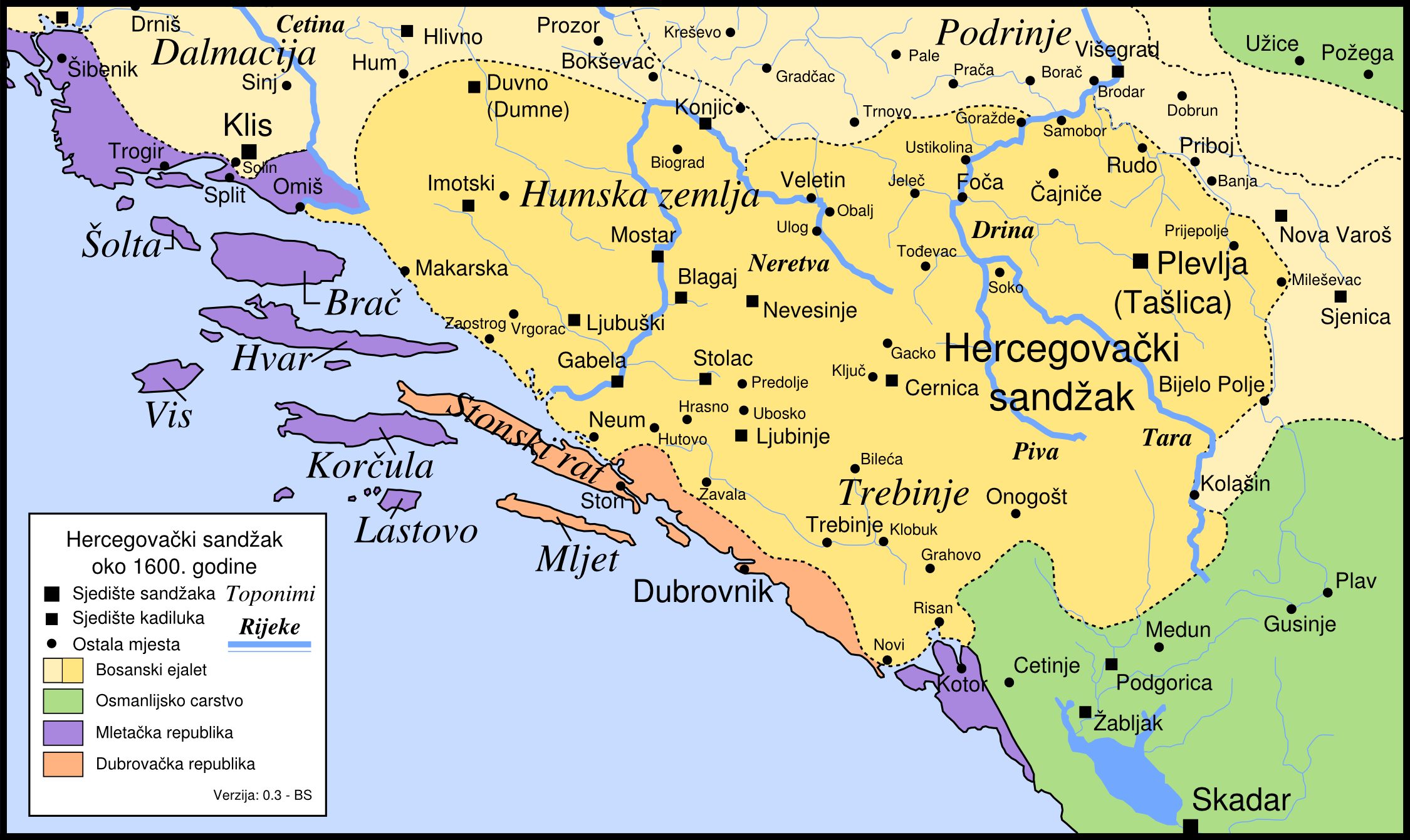
Sanjak of Herzegovina (1600), including eastern regions, known today as the Old Herzegovina

Old Herzegovina (section in modern Montenegro)

The region known today as the Old Herzegovina was part of historical Herzegovina from the middle of 15th century up to the 1878. Initially it was part of the medieval Duchy of St. Sava (Serbo-Croatian: Херцеговина Светог Саве, Hercegovina Svetog Save), established by duke (German: herzog, Serbo-Croatian: herceg, херцег) Stefan Vukčić Kosača within the Kingdom of Bosnia. After the Ottoman conquest, it was part of the Sanjak of Herzegovina. Between 1580 and 1833, Sanjak of Herzegovina was part of the Bosnia Eyalet, and then became a separate Herzegovina Eyalet (1833–1851), of the Ottoman Empire.

The major (western and central) part of historical Herzegovina was occupied by Austria-Hungary in 1878, after the Congress of Berlin, and that region became part of the Condominium of Bosnia and Herzegovina. Since then, the name of Herzegovina was reduced to that region. In the same time, eastern portion of historical Herzegovina was annexed to the Principality of Montenegro (1878), while some sections remained under Ottoman rule (Sanjak of Pljevlja) until 1912, when they were divided between Montenegro and Serbia. All of those regions of historical Herzegovina, detached from it since 1878, became known as the Old Herzegovina.

== See also ==
- Nikola Altomanović
- Stjepan Vukčić Kosača
- Herzegovina

== Sources ==
- Ćirković, Sima (2014) [1964]. "The Double Wreath: A Contribution to the History of Kingship in Bosnia". Balcanica. 45 (45): 107–143. doi:10.2298/BALC1445107C.
- Ćirković, Sima (2004). The Serbs. Malden: Blackwell Publishing. ISBN 9781405142915.
- Morrison, Kenneth (2009). Montenegro: A Modern History. London-New York: I.B.Tauris.
- Šabanović, Hazim (1959). Bosanski pašaluk: Postanak i upravna podjela. Sarajevo: Naučno društvo Bosne i Hercegovine.
- Šćekić, Radenko; Leković, Žarko; Premović, Marijan (2015). "Political Developments and Unrests in Stara Raška (Old Rascia) and Old Herzegovina during Ottoman Rule". Balcanica. 46 (46): 79–106. doi:10.2298/BALC1546079S.
