= Mariano Bolizza =

Nobleman and writer (1603–1643)

Mariano Bolizza or Marin Bolica (1603 – 27 November 1643) was a nobleman and writer from Cattaro (known today as Kotor).

== Biography ==
Bolizza was born in Kotor, at the time part of the Republic of Venice (now Montenegro). He studied at the University of Padua and, having embraced a priestly life, moved to Venice where he became a secretary of nuncio Giovanni Battista Agucchi. Bolizza wrote Agucchi's funeral oration with a dedication to his mentor Claude de Mesmes, comte d'Avaux, the French ambassador to the Republic of Venice. A member of the Bolizza family, his ancestor and family progenitor was Zuane Bolizza, mentioned in 1538. The Bolizza were central in ensuring the safe transport of correspondence between Venice and the Ottoman Empire. They had received an exclusive contract after the Battle of Lepanto (1571). Family heads were often appointed vice-proveditors of Cattaro. His brother was Francesco Bolizza.

== Work ==
A public servant of Venice, he was assigned to provide information on the Sanjak of Scutari, a paper known in Italian as Relazione e descrizione del sangiacato di Scutari. He delivered his documents at Venice on May 25, 1614. The Sanjak of Scutari included the vilayet of Montenegro, which paid an annual tribute. The work contains the earliest description of the people and geography of the modern era Montenegro.

== Legacy ==
The Croatian Encyclopedia describes him as a 'Croatian writer' and notes his works in Latin and Italian.

== See also ==
- Rovca
