= Jovan Erdeljanović =

- Born: 11 November 1874; Pančevo, Austria-Hungary
- Died: 12 February 1944 (aged 69); Belgrade, Kingdom of Yugoslavia
- Resting place: Novo groblje, Belgrade
- Citizenship: Austria-Hungary, Serbia, Yugoslavia
- Education: University of Belgrade, Charles University in Prague
- Scientific career
- Fields: Ph.D of Ethnology
- Doctoral advisor: Lubor Niederle
- Other academic advisors: Jovan Cvijić

Jovan Erdeljanović (11 November 1874 – 12 February 1944) was a Serbian and Yugoslav ethnologist.

== Biography ==
Jovan Erdeljanović was born in Pančevo, Austria-Hungary. He studied at the universities of Vienna, Berlin, Leipzig and Prague. In 1905 he obtained his doctorate as Doctor of Philosophy at Charles University in Prague. In 1906, Erdeljanović began working at the University of Belgrade, elected Professor at Department of Ethnology of the philosophical Faculty since 1922. He remained at the University until 1941 and was member of Serbian Academy of Sciences.

The first recognized work of anthropological interest in ethnicity was done by Erdeljanović, named as one of the founding fathers of Serbian ethnology. His works are influenced by ideas of evolutionism and Yugoslavism and he represented the theory that Yugoslavs are people of one blood and one origin.

== Selected works ==
- Etnološka građa i rasprave, Srpska kraljevska akademija, Belgrade 1911.
- Tragovi najstarijeg slovenskog sloja u Banatu, Niederlův sbornik, Prague 1925.
- Ердељановић, Јован (1926). Стара Црна Гора: Етничка прошлост и формирање црногорских племена. Српски етнографски зборник. Vol. 39. Београд: Српска краљевска академија.
- O poreklu Bunjevaca, Srpska kraljevska akademija, Belgrade 1930.
- Forschungen über Alter, Organisation und Überlieferungen serbischer Stämme in Montenegro, Herzegovina und in den Nachbargebieten Jugoslawiens, Brill, Leiden 1936.
- Koju ćemo kulturu: samo srpsku ili jugoslovensku?, Zora, Belgrade 1938.

== See also ==
- Sima Trojanović
- Tihomir Đorđević
- Ljubomir Davidović
