= Ottoman Serbia =

Period of Serbian history from the late 14th century to 1817

Ottoman Serbia Османска Србија (Serbian)
- 1459–1817
- Territory of modern Serbia under Ottoman rule during the 16th century.
- Common languages: Serbian
- Religion: Sunni Islam (official); Christianity (Serbian Orthodox Church, Roman Catholicism)
- Demonym: Serb

Government
- Beylerbey, Pasha, Agha, Dey
- History
  - Conquest of Smederevo: 1459
  - Second Serbian Uprising: 1817
- Today part of: Serbia

Ottoman Serbia refers to the Ottoman period in the history of Serbia. Various regions of medieval Serbia came under Ottoman rule already at the end of the 14th century, while the Serbian Despotate fell in 1459. Northern regions of what is now the Republic of Serbia were incorporated into the Ottoman Empire during later conquests, from 1521 to 1552. Since the Habsburg expansion towards those northern regions, in 1699 and 1718, Ottoman rule was gradually reduced to Serbian territories south of the Sava and Danube rivers (1739). From 1804 to 1830, the Principality of Serbia was gradually restored, as a vassal state of the Ottoman Empire. It gained independence in 1878, and expanded into southern regions, thus reducing Ottoman control to the historical region of the Old Serbia, that was liberated in 1912, thus ending Ottoman rule in Serbian lands.

The Ottoman conquest of the Balkans was initiated in the middle of the 14th century, leding to consequent conflicts with various Serbian states. The Ottomans defeated the Serbs at the Battle of Maritsa in 1371, and again at the Battle of Kosovo in 1389, forcing several Serbian regional lords to become sultan's vassals. In 1439, the Serbian Despotate was conquered for the first time, but restored in 1444. In 1459, the Despotate was conquered again, this time finally. Similarly, the Principality of Zeta was conquered by the Ottomans for the first time in 1479, but restored in 1481, to be finally conquered in 1496. In the meantime, the Kingdom of Bosnia was conquered by the Ottomans in 1463, and the Duchy of Saint Sava in 1482. Thus by the end of the 15th century, Ottoman rule was established firmly, by imposing new provincial administration in conquered lands.

During the later periods, several revolts broke out against Ottoman rule in various Serbian lands, mostly with the help of the Habsburg Monarchy. Such were the Banat Uprising in 1594, the Uprising of 1688-1690, the Uprising of 1716–1718, and the Uprising of 1788-1791. Those uprisings were marked by the Great Migrations of the Serbs. In 1804, the Great Serbian Uprising broke out, leading to partial liberation of Serbia. It was crushed by the Ottomans in 1813, but already in 1815 the Second Serbian Uprising broke out, resulting in a new political settlement and the creation of the autonomous Principality of Serbia. Its territory was expanded in 1833, and again in 1878, also gaining full independence from the sultan and thus reducing Ottoman rule to historical regions of the Old Serbia. Those regions were liberated in 1912, thus ending the Ottoman period in the history of Serbia.

== History ==
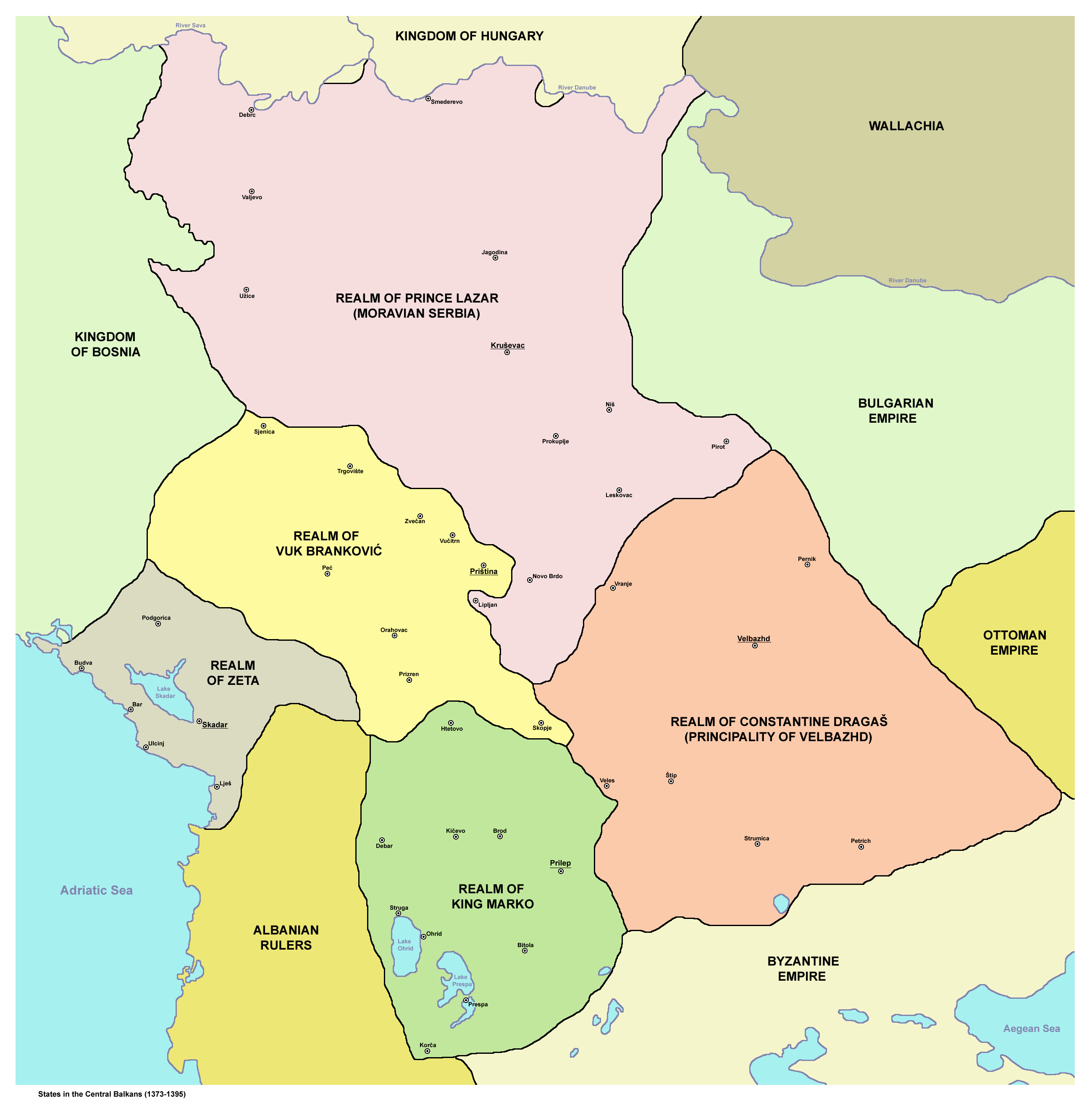
States that emerged after dissolution of Serbian Empire in the 14th century

=== Ottoman conquest (1371–1552) ===
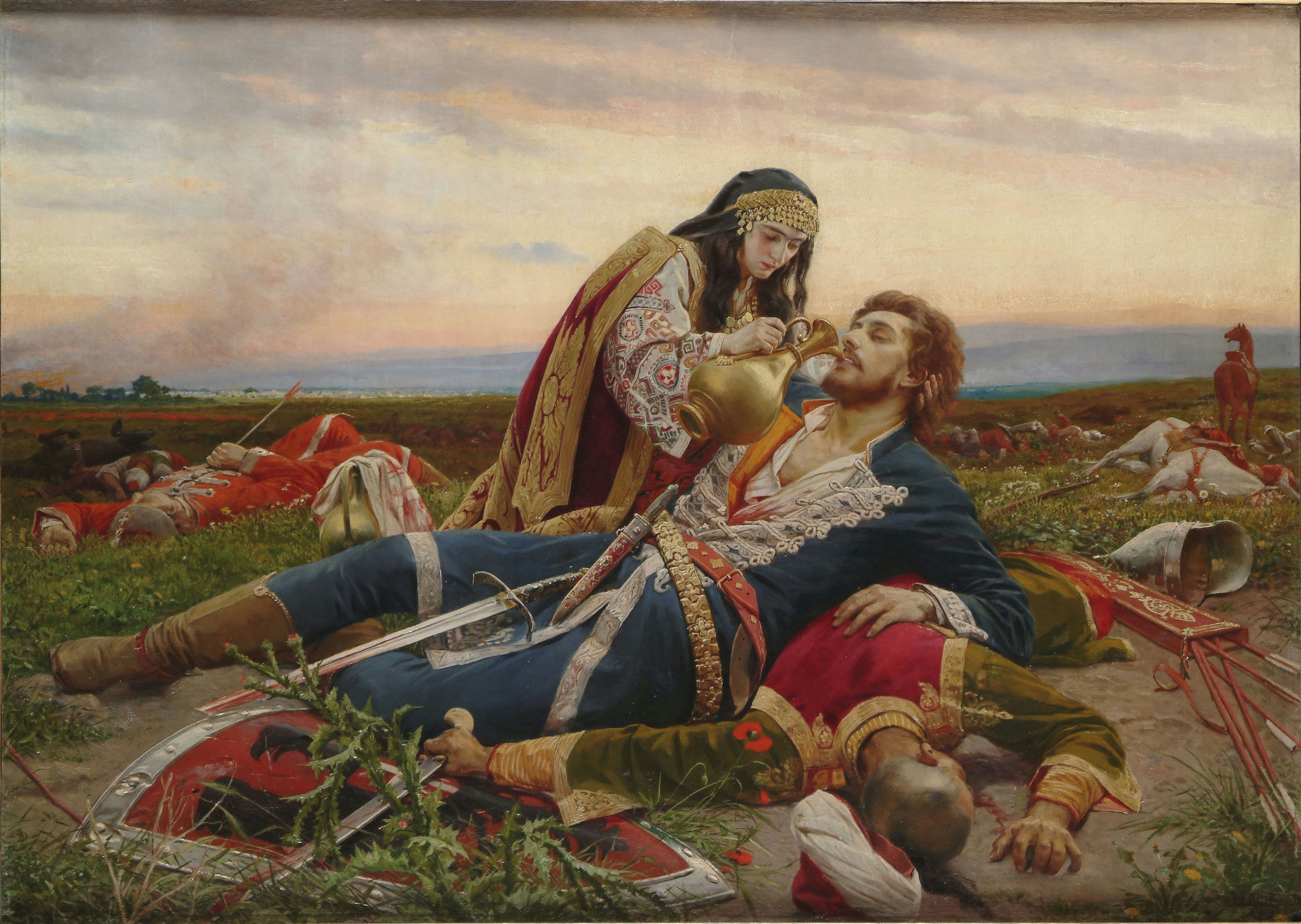
Kosovo Maiden by Uroš Predić

The Ottoman Turks defeated Serbian armies at the battle of Maritsa in 1371, where Serbian king Vukašin and despot Jovan Uglješa were killed, and again at the Battle of Kosovo in 1389, where Serbian prince Lazar and Ottoman sultan Murad I were killed. During that period, several regional lords were forced to become Ottoman vassals: king Marko, despot Jovan Dragaš and lord Konstantin Dejanović in 1371 and prince Stefan Lazarević in 1389. Already in 1386, Ottomans took Niš, and in 1392 they also took Skopje from Serbian lord Vuk Branković, who also became an Ottoman vassal. In 1395, at the battle of Rovine, king Marko and lord Konstantin Dejanović were killed, and Ottomans annexed their domains, excluding the region of Vranje, that was held by Uglješa Vlatković, who also became an Ottoman vassal.

The Battle of Kosovo defined the long-term fate of Serbia, because now it had no force capable of standing up to the Ottoman Turks directly. This was followed by an unstable period marked by the rule of Prince Lazar's son — despot Stefan Lazarević, who was at first a vassal of Sultan Bayezid I, distinguishing himself at the Battle of Nicopolis in 1396 and at Ankara in 1402, and later gaining independence after the death of Bayezid. His cousin and heir Đurađ Branković moved the capital of the Serbian Despotate to the newly built fortified town of Smederevo. The Turks continued their conquest until they finally seized the remaining southern regions in 1455, establishing there the Sanjak of Vučitrn and the Sanjak of Prizren, and then proceeded by conquering all of northern territory of the Serbian Despotate by 1459, establishing there the Sanjak of Kruševac and the Sanjak of Smederevo. After the fall of the Serbian Despotate, Serbian lands were ruled by the Ottoman Empire for almost three centuries. Traditions of the Serbian Despotate were continued in southern parts of the Kingdom of Hungary by exiled members of the Branković dynasty and their successors until 1537.

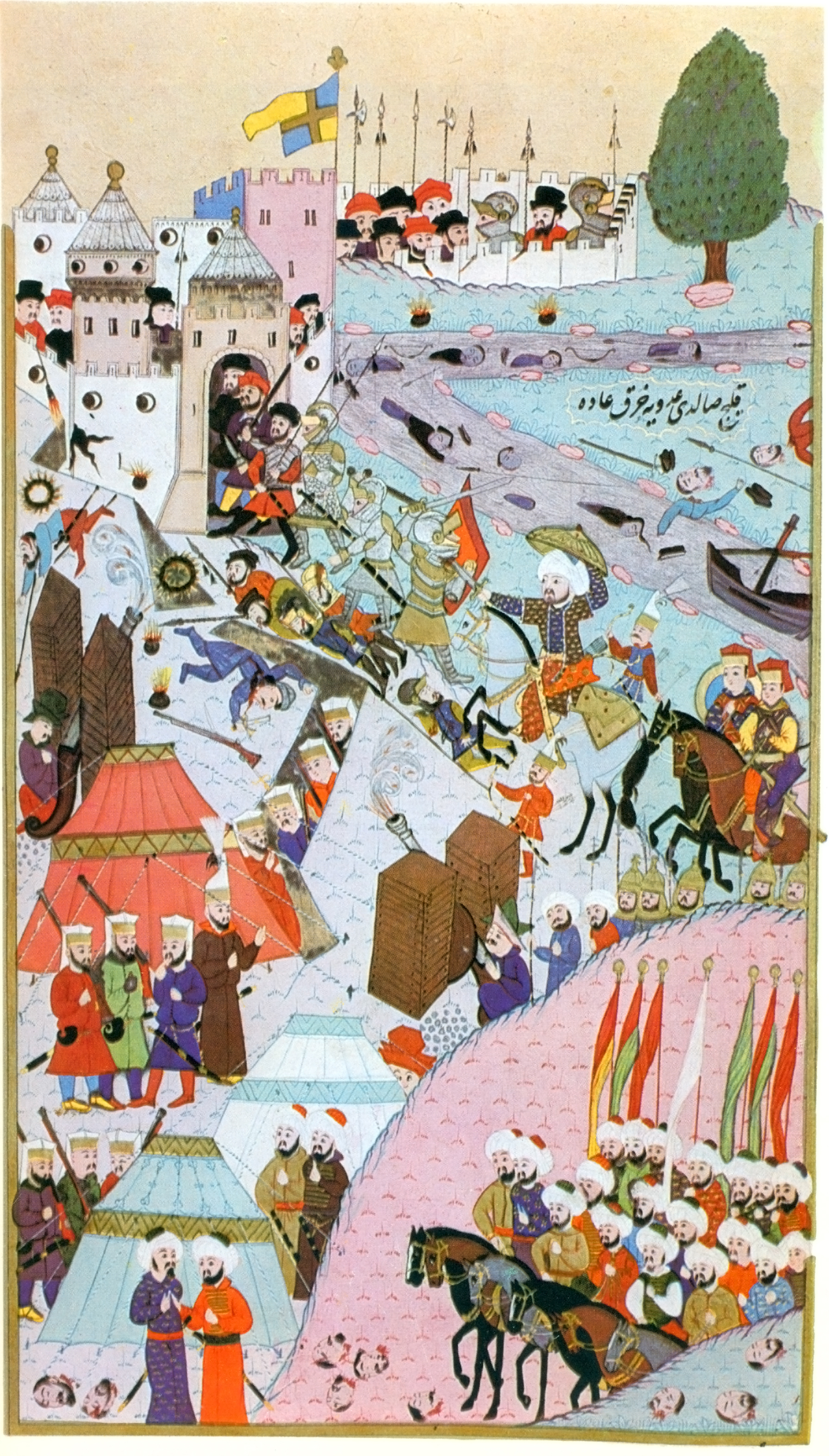
Ottoman Army during the Siege of Belgrade (1456).

Since the 15th century, an increasing number of Serbs began migrating from the Ottoman-held parts of Serbia towards various northern and western territories, mainly to the southern parts of the Kingdom of Hungary (the region today known as Vojvodina). The Hungarian kings encouraged the immigration of Serbs to the kingdom, and hired many of them as soldiers and border guards. Therefore, the Serb population of this region highly increased. In 1521, Ottomans took Šabac and captured Belgrade, thus completing the conquest of central Serbian regions, and incorporating them into the Sanjak of Smederevo.

During the struggle between the Ottoman Empire and Hungary, this Serb population attempted a restoration of the Serbian state. In the battle of Mohač on 29 August 1526, Ottoman forces destroyed the army of the Hungarian king Louis II, who was killed on the battlefield. After the battle, Hungary broke up into three parts, and much of its former territory became part of the Ottoman Empire. Soon after the Battle of Mohač the leader of Serbian mercenaries in Hungary, Jovan Nenad, called "The Black", established his rule in Bačka, northern Banat, and a small part of Srem (these three regions are now parts of Vojvodina). He created a short-lived independent state with the city of Subotica as its capital. At the peak of his power Jovan Nenad crowned himself in Subotica as the Serbian emperor. Taking advantage of the extremely confused military and political situation, the Hungarian noblemen from the region joined forces against him and defeated the Serbian troops in the summer of 1527. Emperor Jovan Nenad was assassinated and his state collapsed.

By 1552, Ottomans completed the conquest of Banat and Bačka, and created the Temeşvar Eyalet and the Sanjak of Segedin, thus incorporating the entire territory of modern Serbia under their rule. In 1557, Ottomans allowed the reestablishment of the Serbian Patriarchate of Peć, that existed until 1766, when it was abolished by the sultan.

=== Between Ottomans and Habsburgs ===
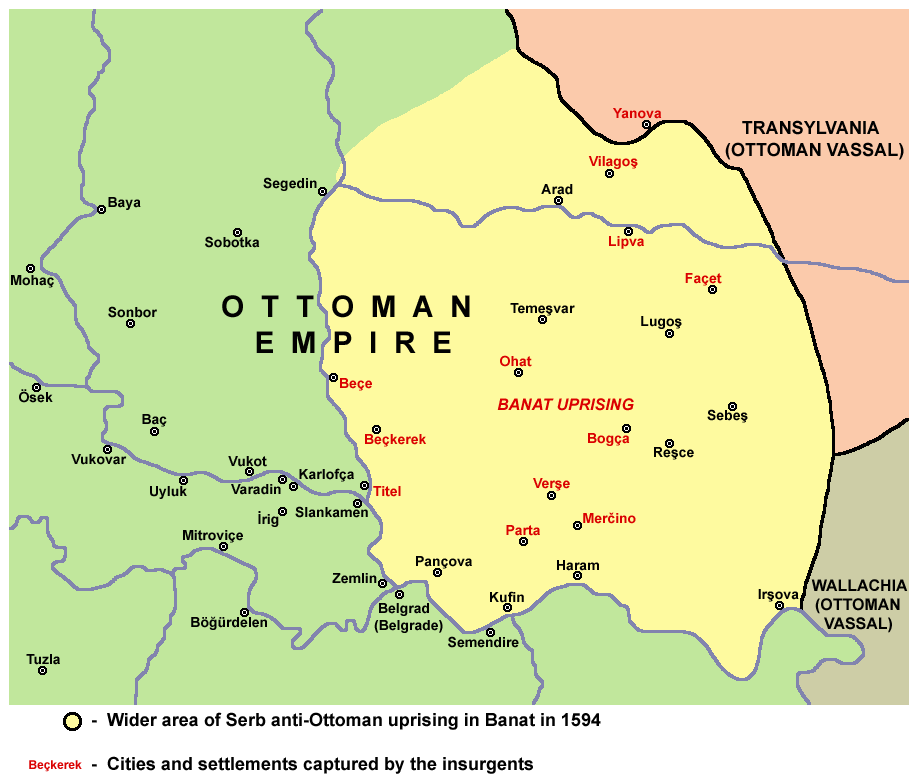
Territory of the uprising of local Serbian and Romanian Christians in the Temeşvar Eyalet (1594)

Christian powers, the Habsburg monarchy and the Venetian republic in particular, fought several wars against the Ottoman Empire during the early modern period, from the 16th to the 18th century, relying on the help of the Serbs who lived under Ottoman rule. In 1594, during the Habsburg-Ottoman War (1593–1606), local Serbs staged an uprising in the Temeşvar Eyalet (modern Banat). Ottoman commander Sinan Pasha retaliated by burning the remains of Saint Sava, the most notable Serbian saint. In the same time, Serbs created another center of resistance in the Sanjak of Herzegovina, but when peace was reached between Habsburgs and Ottomans (1606), they were abandoned to Turkish retaliation.

During the 16th and the 17th centuries, several Serbian uprisings against Ottoman rule broke out in various regions. In the Banat region, which then formed part of the Ottoman Eyalet of Temeşvar, in the area around Vršac, a large uprising began against the Ottoman Empire in 1594. It was the largest uprising of Serbian people against Ottoman rule till then. The leader of this uprising was Teodor Nestorović, the Bishop of Vršac. Other leaders were Sava Ban and voivode Velja Mironić. For a short time, the Serb rebels captured several cities, including Vršac, Bečkerek, and Lipova, as well as Titel and Bečej in Bačka. The size of this uprising is illustrated by the verse from one Serbian national song: "Sva se butum zemlja pobunila, Šest stotina podiglo se sela, Svak na cara pušku podigao!" ("The whole land has rebelled, six hundred villages arose, everybody pointed his gun against the emperor"). The rebellion had the character of a holy war, the Serb rebels carrying flags with the image of Saint Sava. Sinan Pasha, who led the Ottoman army, ordered the green flag of Muhammad brought from Damascus to counter the Serbian flag, and burned the remains of Saint Sava in Belgrade.

The Serb Uprising of 1596-97 in the region of Herzegovina and surrounding areas was organized by Serbian Patriarch Jovan Kantul and led by voivode Grdan.

The Great War between Ottomans and the Holy League took place from 1683 to 1699. The Holy League was created with the sponsorship of the Pope and included the Habsburg monarchy, Poland and Venice. These three powers incited the Serbs to rebel against the Ottoman authorities, and soon uprisings and guerrilla warfare spread throughout the western Balkans, ranging from Montenegro and the Dalmatian coast to the Danube basin and Vardarian Macedonia. In 1688, Habsburg forces captured Belgrade, and advanced into the Old Serbia (regions of Raška, Kosovo, Metohija) in 1689, but soon retreated from those regions and lost the city of Belgrade already in 1690. However, when the Habsburg forces started to pull out of Serbia, they invited the Serbian people to come north with them to the Austrian territories. Having to choose between Ottoman reprisal and living in a Christian state, Serbs abandoned their homesteads and headed north, led by Serbian Patriarch Arsenije III.

=== Ottoman Serbia in the XVIII century ===
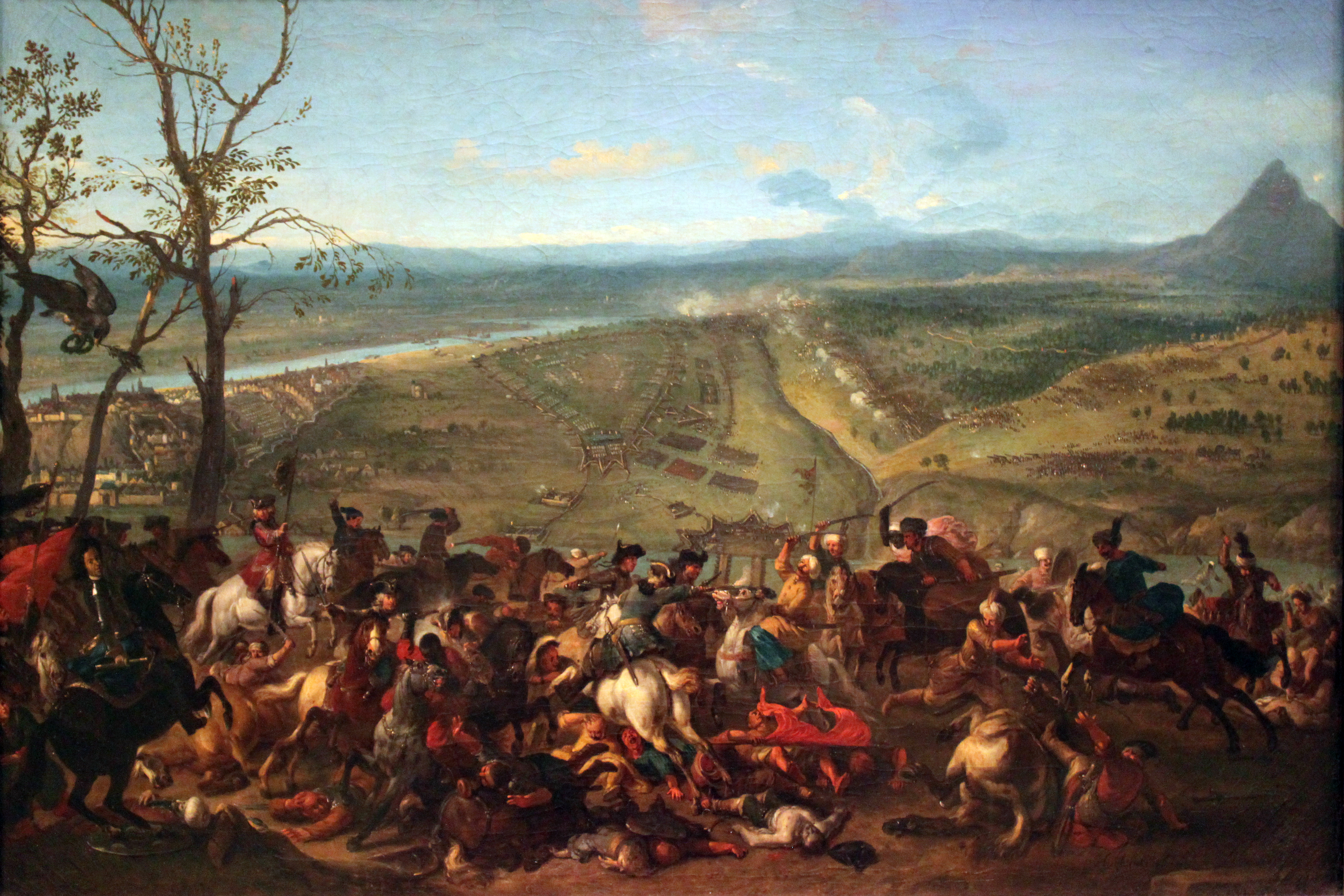
Prince Eugene of Savoy captures Belgrade, 1717

Borders established by the Treaty of Karlowitz in 1699 were stable until the breakout of the new Habsburg-Ottoman war (1716–1718), that ended with the Treaty of Passarowitz in 1718. Habsburg gained the region of lower Syrmia, the Banat of Temeswar, and Belgrade with central Serbian regions, that were organized, from 1718 to 1739, as the Habsburg Kingdom of Serbia (1718–1739). The fall of Habsburg Serbia during the next Habsburg-Ottoman war (1737–1739) was followed by the Second Great Migration of the Serbs from regions that fell under the Ottoman rule, into regions still held by the Habsburg Empire.

In the meantime, a Serbian-Russian noble, count Sava Vladislavich maintained contacts with Ottoman Serbs and was under the impression that they would rise in revolt against the Sultan as soon as Russians invaded the Danubian Principalities. Having launched the invasion in 1711, Tsar Peter sent him on a mission to Moldavia and Montenegro, whose population Vladislavich was expected to incite to rebellion. Little came of these plans, despite the assistance of a pro-Russian colonel, Michael Miloradovich (the ancestor of Count Miloradovich). Much later, Petar I Petrović-Njegoš, the Prince-Bishop of Montenegro (Serbian Orthodox Bishop of Cetinje), conceived a plan to form a new Serbian Empire out of Bosnia, central Serbia, Herzegovina and Montenegro with Boka, with Dubrovnik as its Imperial Capital. In 1807, he sent a letter to the Russian General of the Danube Army regarding this subject: "The Russian Czar would be recognized as the Tsar of the Serbs and the Metropolitan of Montenegro would be his assistant. The leading role in the restoration of the Serbian Empire belongs to Montenegro."

In the latter half of the XVIII century, officer Koča Anđelković led a successful Serbian rebellion against the Ottomans, during the last Habsburg-Ottoman war (1788–1791), hoping to place central Serbia under the Habsburg rule. The liberated territory was thus known as Koča's Frontier. The rebellion ended with the Treaty of Sistova and the withdrawal of Habsburgs in 1791-1792.

In the same tame, a prominent Serbian nobleman Sava Tekelija from the Habsburg Monarchy, conceived a plan for liberation of Serbian regions and recreation of national statehood. In the assembly of Serbian representatives, that was held in Temišvar (1790), he made a speech pleading for the legal inclusion of Serbian privileges into Hungarian state laws, and during the First Uprising (1804-1813) against the Ottoman rule, he made a map of Serbian lands that served as a political manifest. He sent letters to Napoleon proposing the establishment of a South Slavic political unit with Serbia at its core. To achieve that goal, he suggested that France should help the Serbs in order to suppress Russian influence in these territories. He sent a similar letter to Austrian Emperor Francis I in 1805. His project implied an establishment of a Serbian state, or more generally, a South Slavic state.

=== Ottoman Serbia 1791–1804 ===
The withdrawal of the Austrians from Serbia in 1791 marked the end of the Serbian rebellion, which had been supported by Austria since 1787-1788. However Austria needed to settle the war, and returned the Belgrade region to the Ottoman Empire. Despite guarantees that Austria had insisted on, many of the participants in the uprising and their families went into exile in Austria. Reforms made by the Porte to ease the pressure on Serbs were only temporary; by 1799 the Janissary corps had returned, suspended Serb autonomy and drastically increased taxes, enforcing martial law in Serbia.

In 1802, renegade Janissary leaders, known as dahias, imprisoned and murdered Hadji Mustafa Pasha, sultan's governor in Belgrade, and imposed the rule of terror. Serbian leaders from both sides of the Danube began to conspire against the dahias. When they were found out in 1804, dahias rounded up and murdered 70 prominent Serbian leaders and priests, many of them being tortured and publicly executed in a spree of terror, known as the Slaughter of the Knezes.

=== First Serbian Uprising ===
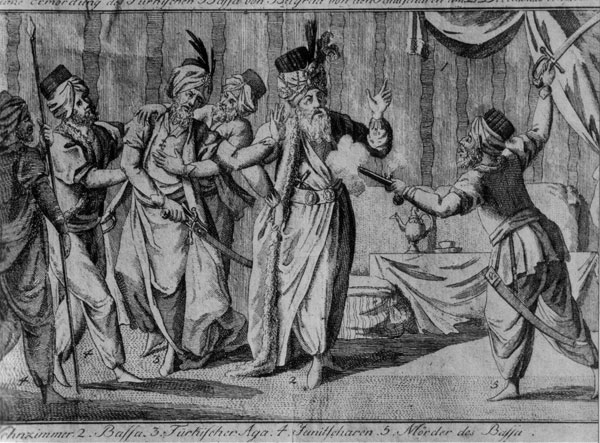
Dahias (renegade Janissary) assassinate Hadži Mustafa Pasha, plate from 1802

The Slaughter of the Knezes at the beginning of 1804 outraged the Serbian people and incited the revolt across the Pashaluk of Belgrade. Within days, in the small Šumadija village of Orašac, the Serbs gathered on February 14th to proclaim the uprising, electing Đorđe Petrović, known as Kara-Đorđe (Black George) as the leader. That afternoon, a Turkish inn (caravanserai) in Orašac was burned and its residents fled or were killed, followed by similar actions country-wide. Soon the cities Valjevo and Požarevac were liberated, and the siege of Belgrade launched.

Initially fighting to restore their local privileges within the Ottoman system (until 1807), the rebels – supported by the wealthy Serbian community from the southern regions of the Austrian Empire (present-day Vojvodina) and Serbian officers from the Austrian Military Frontier – offered themselves to be placed under the protection of Habsburg, Russian and French Empires respectively, entering, as a new political factor, into the converging aspirations of the Great Powers during the Napoleonic Wars in Europe.

During the almost 10 years of the First Serbian Uprising (1804–1813), Serbia perceived itself as an independent state for the first time, after more than 300 years of continuous Ottoman and short periods of Habsburg occupations. Encouraged by the Russian Empire, demands for self-government within the Ottoman Empire in 1804 developed into a war for independence by 1807. Combining patriarchal peasant democracy with modern national goals, the Serbian revolution was attracting thousands of volunteers among Serbs from across Southeastern and Central Europe. The Serbian Revolution ultimately became a symbol of the nation-building process in the Balkans, provoking peasant unrest among Christians in both Greece and Bulgaria.

Following a successful siege with 25,000 men, on 8 January 1807 the charismatic leader of the revolt, Karađorđe Petrović, proclaimed Belgrade the capital of Serbia.

Serbian rebels also decided to establish their separate institutions: Governing Council (Praviteljstvujušči Sovjet) and other administrative bodies, as well as educational institutions such as the Velika škola and the Theological Seminary (Bogoslovija). Karađorđe and other revolutionary leaders sent their children to the Grand School, which also had among its students Vuk Stefanović Karadžić (1787–1864), the famous reformer of the Serbian alphabet. Belgrade was repopulated by local military leaders, merchants and craftsmen, but also by an important group of enlightened Serbs from the Habsburg Empire who gave a new cultural and political framework to the egalitarian peasant society of Serbia. Dositej Obradović, a prominent figure of the Serbian Enlightenment, the founder of the Great Academy, became the first Minister of Education in modern Serbia in 1811.

Following the French invasion in 1812 the Russian Empire withdrew its support for the Serb rebels. Unwilling to accept anything less than independence, the revolutionaries were fought into submission following the Ottoman incursion into Serbia. One quarter of Serbia's population (at that moment around 100,000 people) were exiled into the Habsburg Empire, including the leader of the Uprising, Karađorđe Petrović. Recaptured by the Ottomans in October 1813, Belgrade became a scene of brutal revenge, with hundreds of its citizens massacred, and thousands sold into slavery as far away as Asia. Direct Ottoman rule also meant the abolition of all Serbian institutions, including the Velika škola and the return of Ottoman Turks to Serbia.

=== Hadži-Prodan's rebellion (1814) ===
Despite the Ottoman reconquest, tensions nevertheless persisted. In 1814 the unsuccessful Hadži-Prodan's rebellion was launched by Hadži Prodan Gligorijević, a veteran of the First Serbian Uprising. He knew the Turks would arrest him, so he thought it best to resist the Ottomans. Miloš Obrenović, another veteran, felt the time was not right for an uprising and did not provide assistance. Turkish authorities responded to the rebellion by massacring the local population and publicly impaling 200 prisoners at Belgrade. Hadži Prodan's uprising soon failed and he fled to Austria.

=== Second Serbian Uprising ===
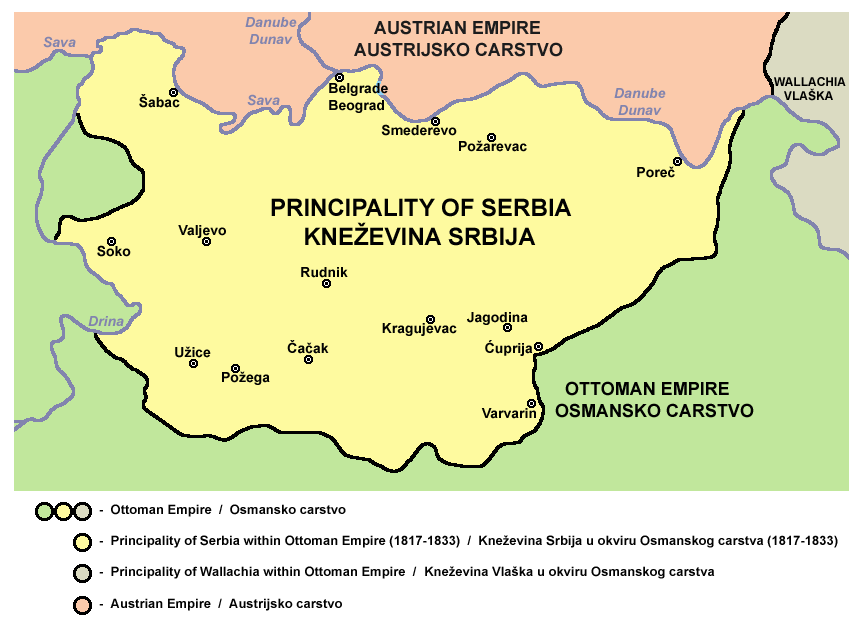
Principality of Serbia after Second Serbian Uprising (1815)

The Second Serbian Uprising (1815) was a second phase of the national revolution of the Serbs against the Ottoman Empire, which erupted shortly after the brutal annexation of the country to the Ottoman Empire and the failed Hadži Prodan's revolt. The revolutionary council proclaimed an uprising in Takovo on April 23, 1815, with Miloš Obrenović chosen as the leader (while Karađorđe was still in exile in Austria). The decision of Serbian leaders was based on two reasons. First, they feared a general massacre of knezes. Second, they learned that Karađorđe was planning to return from exile in Russia. The anti-Karađorđe faction, including Miloš Obrenović, was anxious to forestall Karađorđe and keep him out of power.

Fighting resumed at Easter in 1815, and Miloš became the supreme leader of the new revolt. When the Ottomans discovered this they sentenced all of its leaders to death. The Serbs fought in battles at Ljubić, Čačak, Palez, Požarevac and Dublje and managed to reconquer the Pashaluk of Belgrade. Miloš advocated a policy of restraint: captured Ottoman soldiers were not killed and civilians were released. His announced goal was not independence but to put an end to abusive misrule.

Wider European events now helped the Serbian cause. Political and diplomatic means in negotiations between the Prince of Serbia and the Ottoman Porte, instead of further war clashes coincided with the political rules within the framework of Metternich's Europe. Prince Miloš Obrenović, an astute politician and able diplomat, in order to confirm his hard-won loyalty to the Porte in 1817 ordered the assassination of Karađorđe Petrović. The final defeat of Napoleon in 1815 raised Turkish fears that Russia might again intervene in the Balkans. To avoid this the sultan agreed to make Serbia suzerain – a semi-independent state nominally responsible to the Porte.

=== Ottoman Serbia from 1815 to 1912 ===
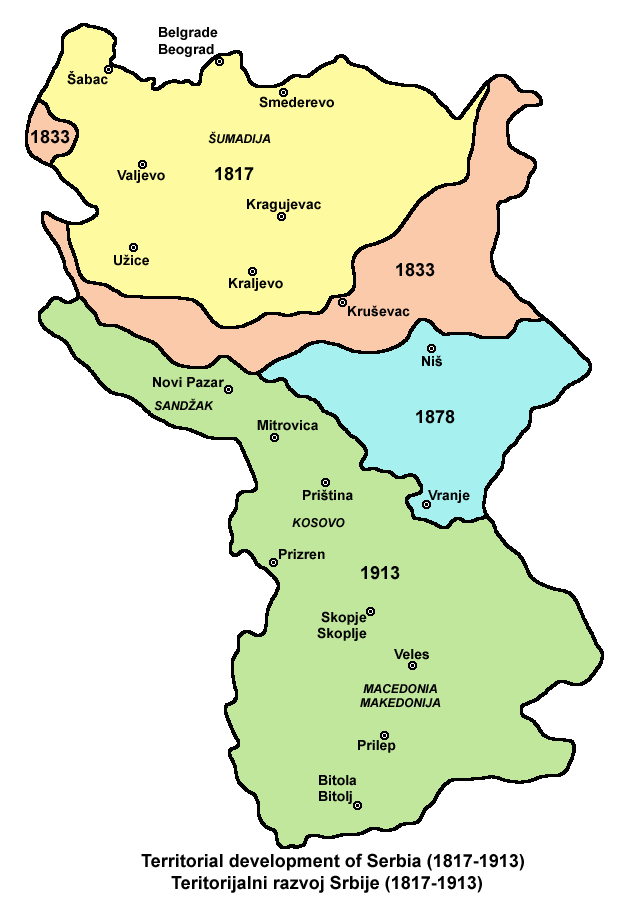
Expansion of the renewed Serbian state into Ottoman Serbia from 1815 to 1912

Since 1815, Ottoman Serbia was politically divided between the autonomous Principality of Serbia that was under sultan's suzerainty, and the rest of Serbian regions that were under direct Ottoman rule. In 1833, a sultan's charter (Hatt-i sharif) was issued, granting the expansion of the Principality towards six bordering regions. In 1841, the Niš rebellion broke out, but it was suppressed by Ottoman authorities.

During the Serbian–Ottoman Wars (1876–1878), southern regions were liberated and incorporated into the Principality, that was recognized as an independent state at the Congress of Berlin (1878), thus ending Ottoman suzerainty over the Serbian state, that was risen to the rank of Kingdom in 1882. Remaining Serbian regions under Ottoman rule were known as the Old Serbia. Those territories were liberated during the Balkan Wars (1912-1913) and incorporated into the Kingdom of Serbia, thus ending the Ottoman rule in Serbian lands.

== Ottoman Serbs ==
Ottoman Serbs, who were mainly Eastern Orthodox Christians, were officially classified, under the Ottoman Millet system, within the Rum Millet (tur. millet-i Rûm), together with Eastern Orthodox Greeks. Although the creation of a separate Serbian millet (tur. Sırp Milleti) was proposed on several occasions, those initiatives were not officially accepted by Ottoman authorities. Thus the local Serbian ecclesiastical and educational institutions remained to serve as main representatives of the Ottoman Serbs, until 1908, when the Serbian Democratic League in the Ottoman Empire was established, as the central political organization of the Serbian people in the Ottoman Empire. In the 1908 Ottoman general election, three Serbian representatives were elected to the Chamber of Deputies: Sava Stojanović (Priština), Aleksandar Parlić (Skopje) and Janićije Dimitrijević (Bitola), while Temko Popović (Ohrid) was elected to the Senate. The first political assembly of Ottoman Serbs was held in February 1909, in Skopje, then the capital city of the Kosovo vilayet.

== Gallery ==
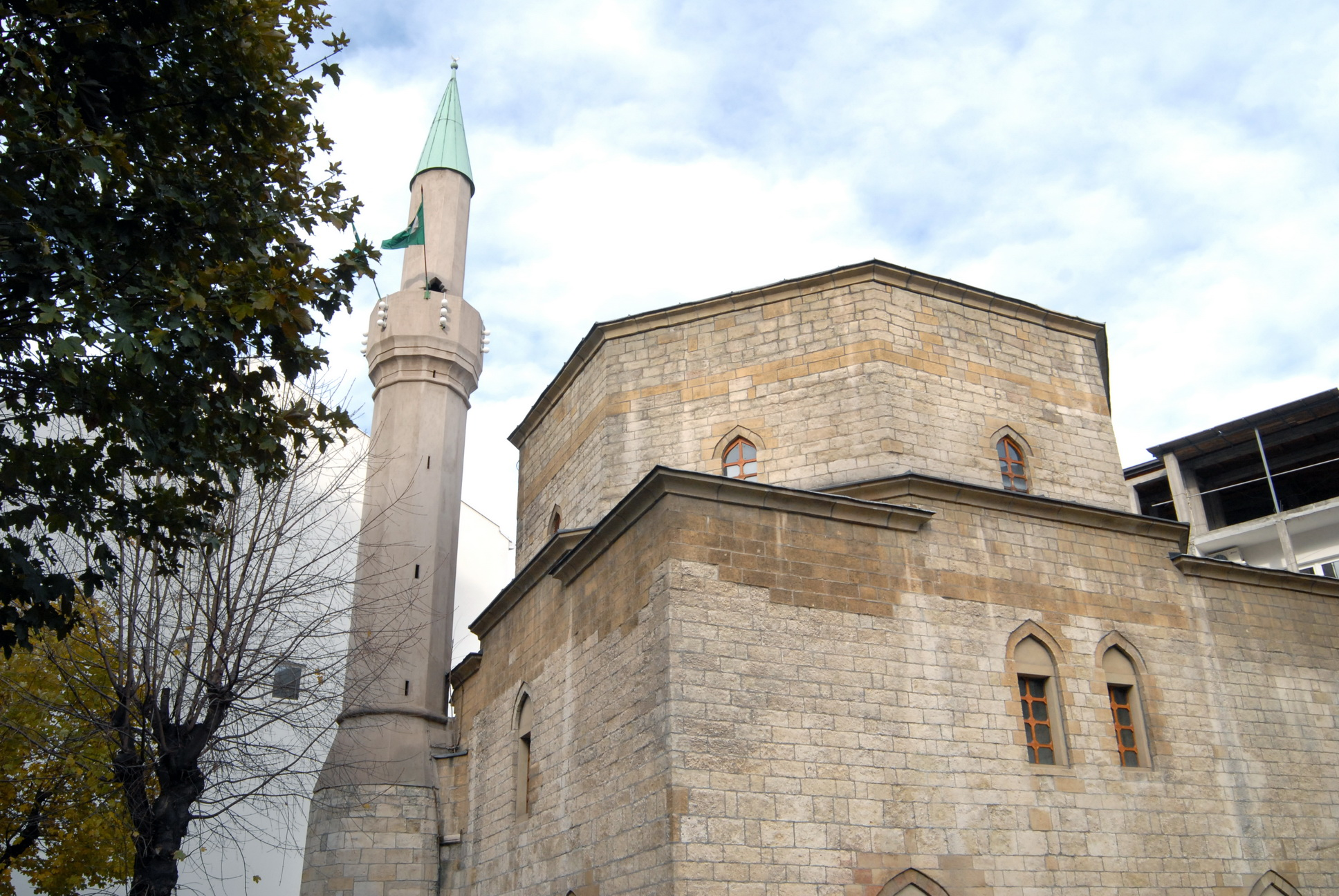
Bajrakli Mosque, Belgrade, 1575

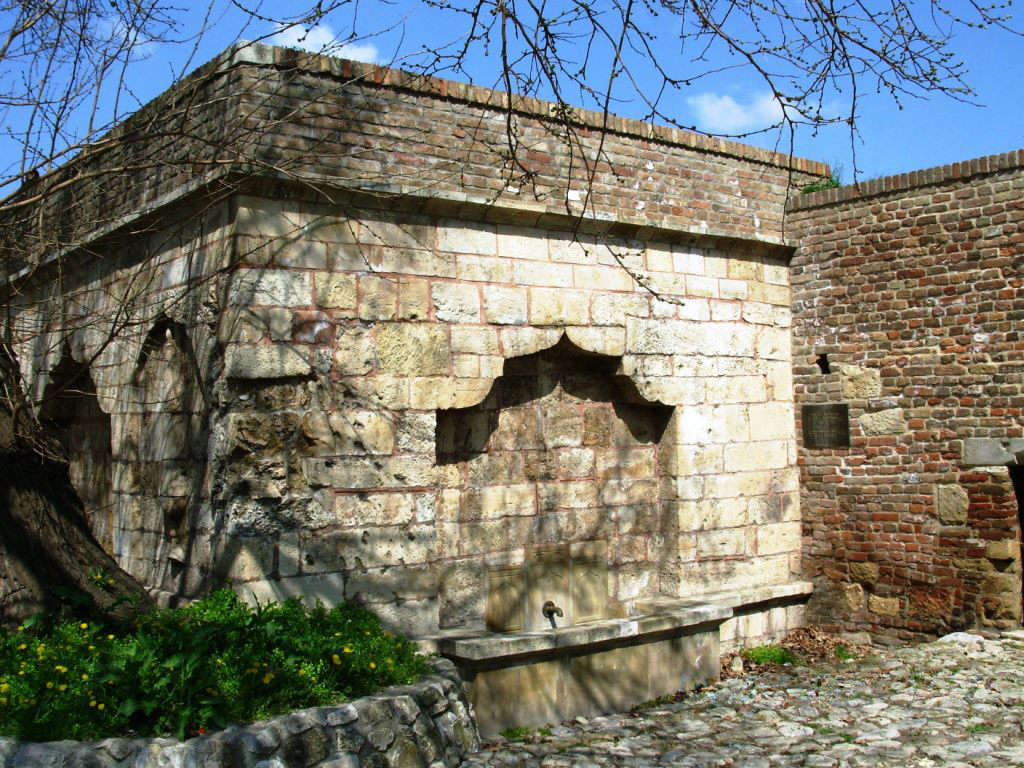
Mehmed Paša Sokolović's Fountain, Belgrade, 1576/77

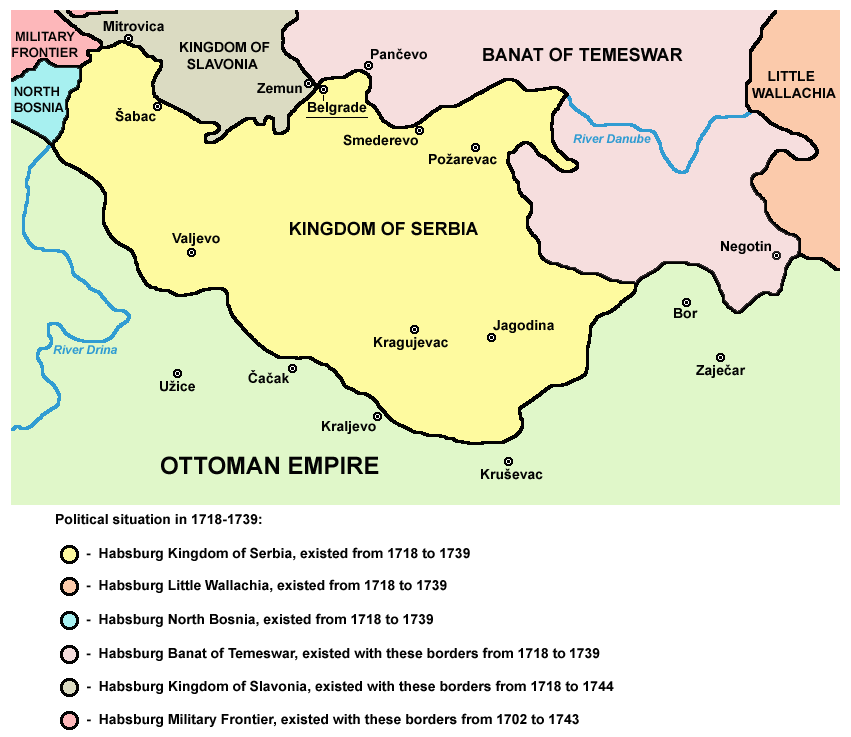
Central regions of Serbia divided between Habsburgs and Ottomans, from 1718 to 1739

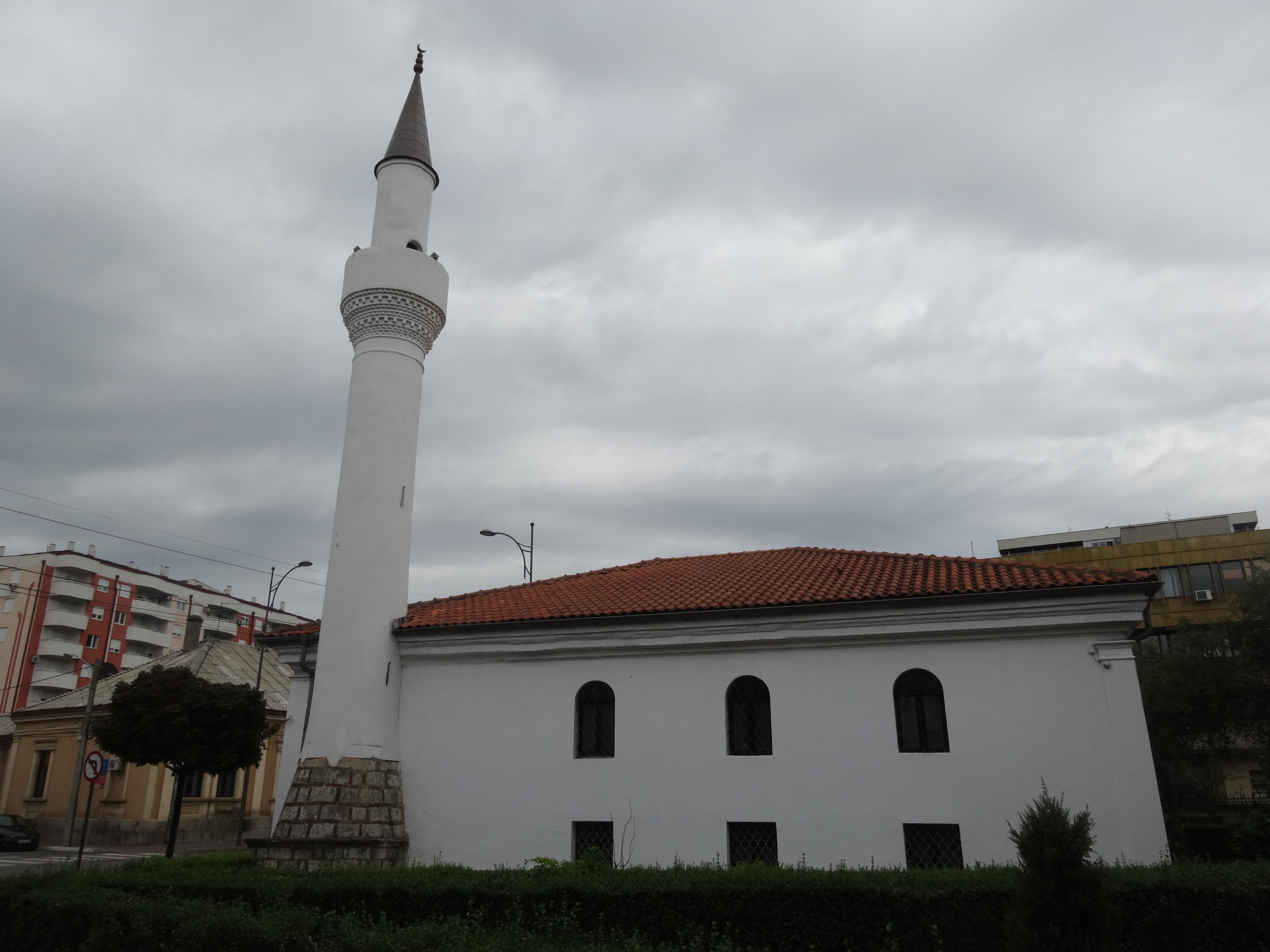
Islam-aga's Mosque, Niš, 1720

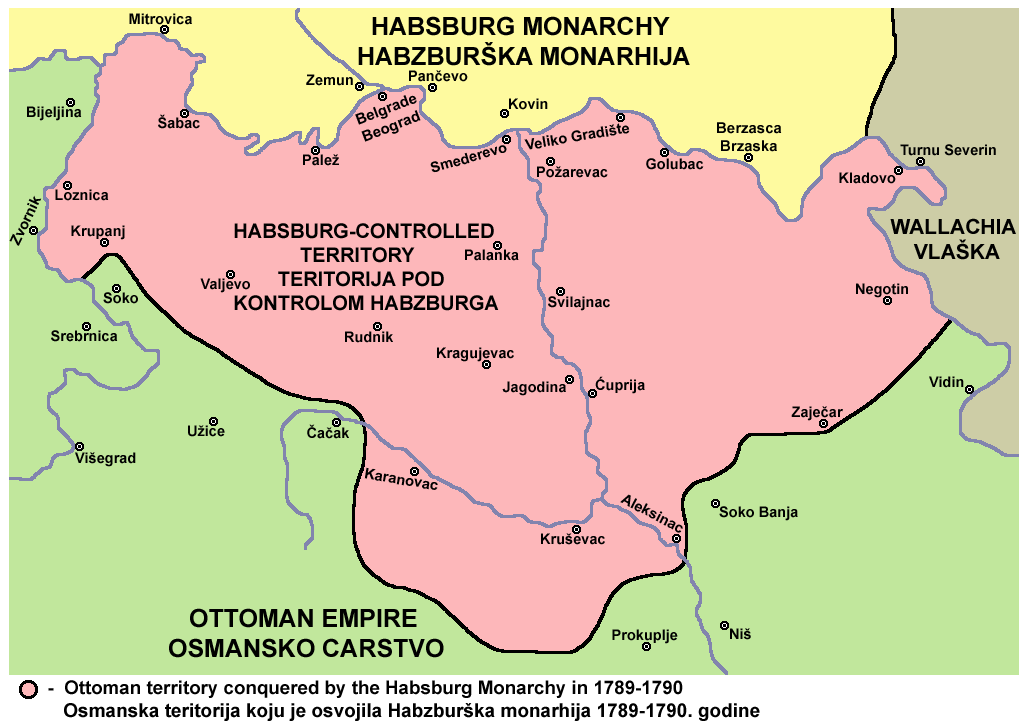
Habsburg-occupied Serbia (1788–1791)

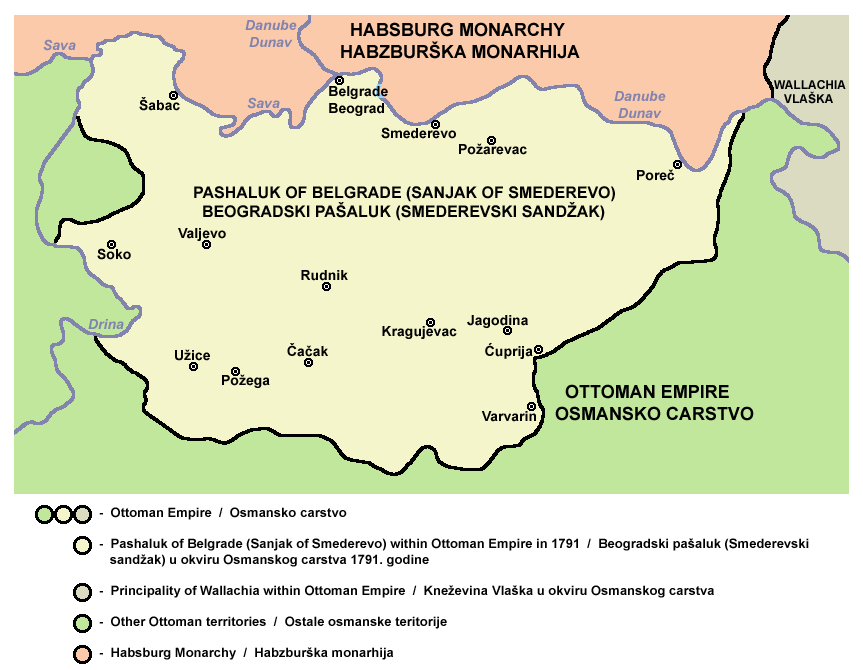
Belgrade pashaluk (Sanjak of Smederevo) in 1791

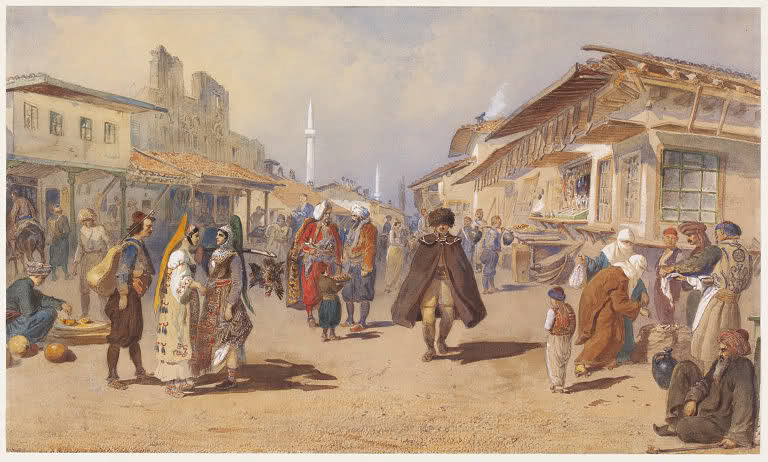
Ottoman Belgrade

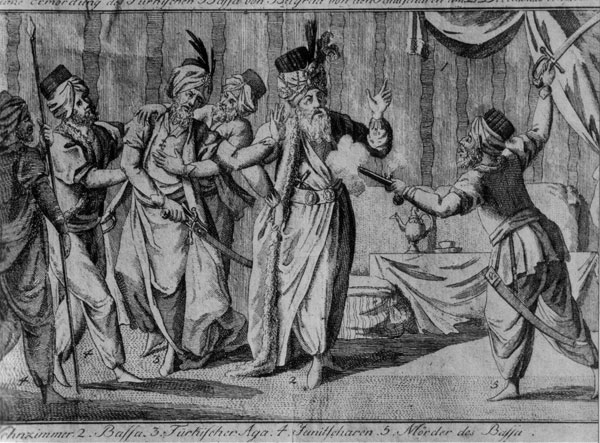
Dahias (renegade Janissary) assassinate Hadži Mustafa Pasha, plate from 1802

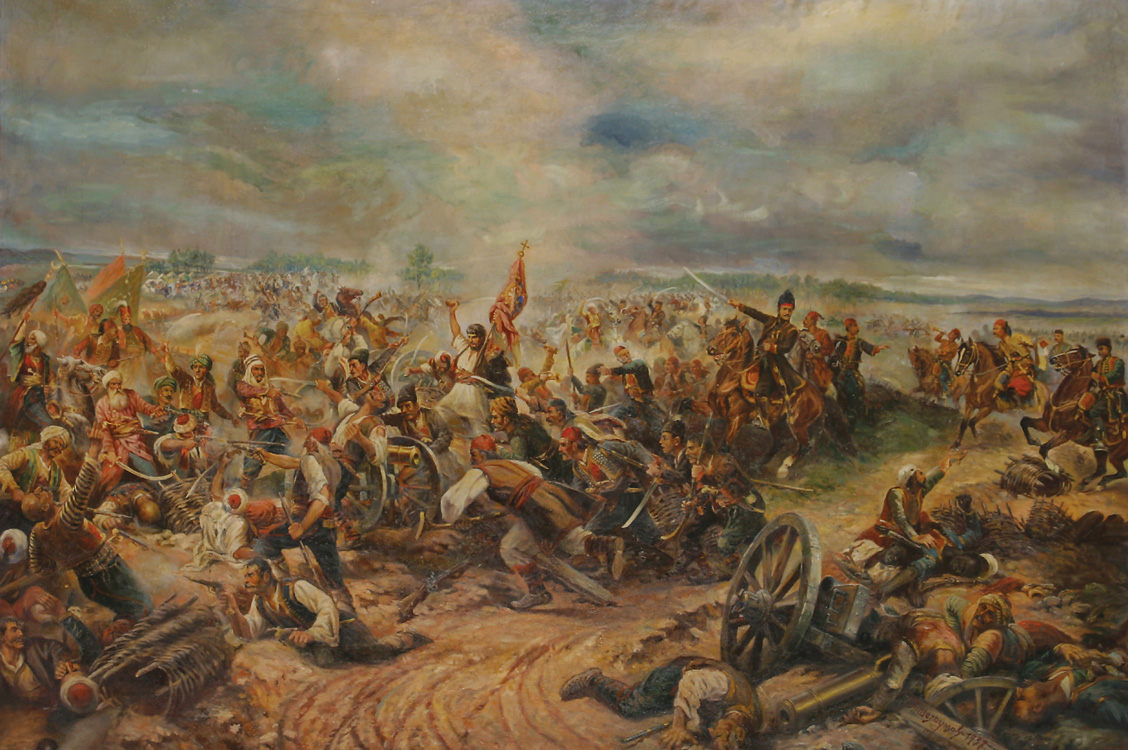
Battle of Mišar in 1806

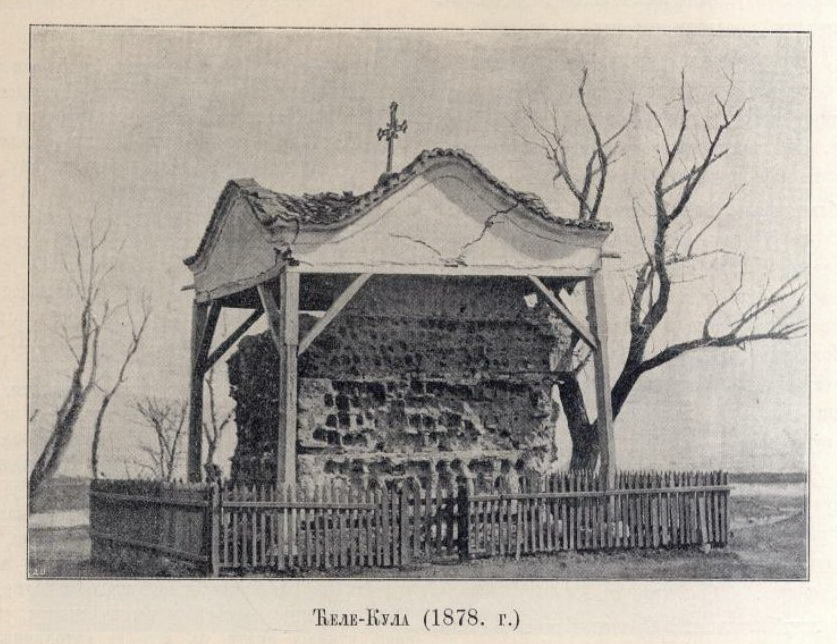
Skull Tower, Niš, 1809

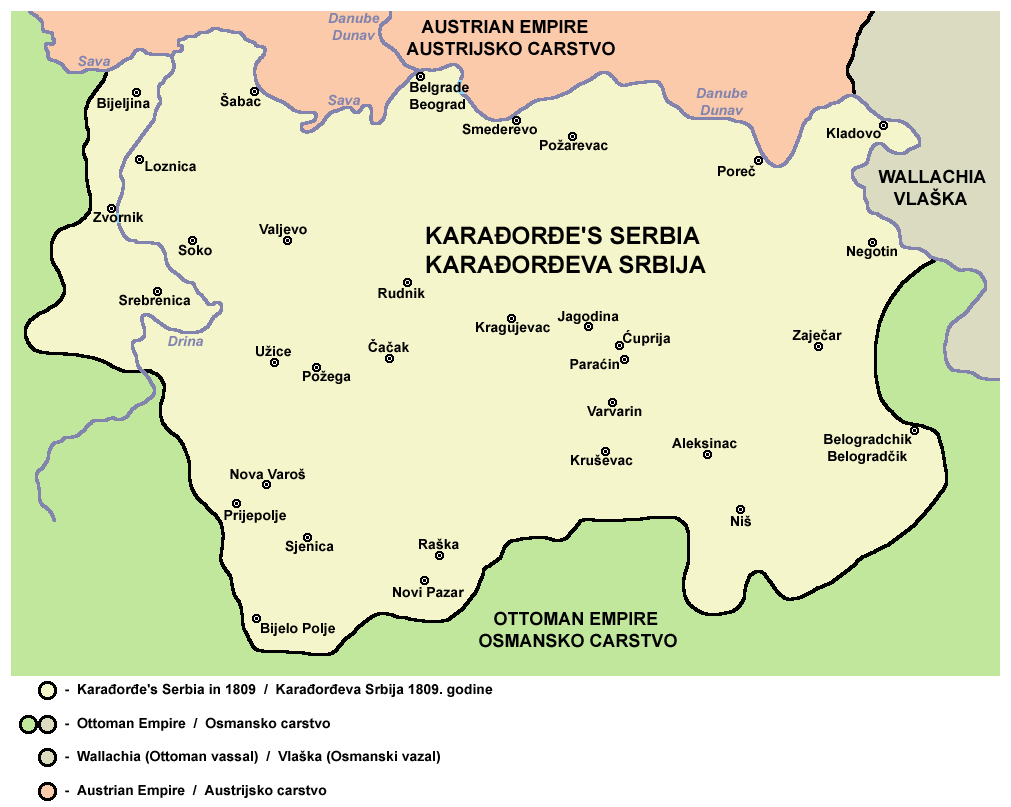
Liberated regions of Serbia in 1809

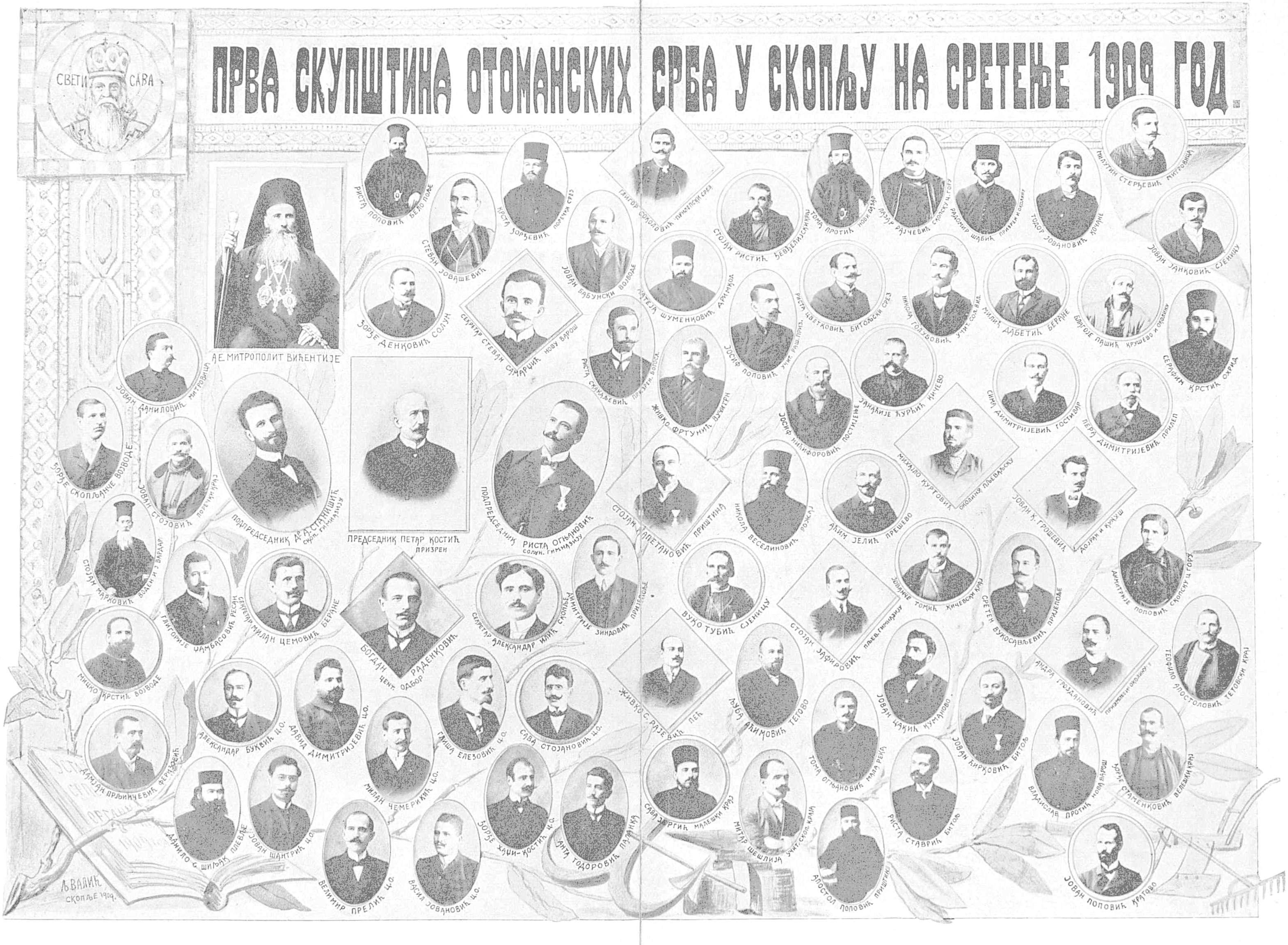
Participants of the first political assembly of Ottoman Serbs, held in Skopje (February 1909)

== See also ==
- Violence against Serbs during the late Ottoman era
- Association for Serb Liberation and Unification
- Main Board for Serb Liberation
- Honorary Consulate of Serbia, Bitola
- Association of Serbo-Macedonians
- Serb volunteers in the Greek War of Independence

== Sources ==
- Bataković, Dušan T., ed. (2005). Histoire du peuple serbe [History of the Serbian People] (in French). Lausanne: L’Age d’Homme. ISBN 9782825119587. Archived from the original on 2024-09-29.
- Bronza, Boro (2010). "The Habsburg Monarchy and the Projects for Division of the Ottoman Balkans, 1771–1788". Empires and Peninsulas: Southeastern Europe between Karlowitz and the Peace of Adrianople, 1699–1829. Berlin: LIT Verlag. pp. 51–62. ISBN 9783643106117.
- Čanak-Medić, Milka; Todić, Branislav (2017). The Monastery of the Patriarchate of Peć. Novi Sad: Platoneum, Beseda. ISBN 9788685869839.
- Ćirković, Sima (2004). The Serbs. Malden: Blackwell Publishing. ISBN 9781405142915. Archived from the original on 2025-03-11.
- Davies, Brian (2011). Empire and Military Revolution in Eastern Europe: Russia's Turkish Wars in the Eighteenth Century. London & New York: Bloomsbury Publishing. ISBN 978-1-4411-6880-1. Archived from the original on 2024-12-16.
- Fine, John Van Antwerp Jr. (1994) [1987]. The Late Medieval Balkans: A Critical Survey from the Late Twelfth Century to the Ottoman Conquest. Ann Arbor, Michigan: University of Michigan Press. ISBN 0472082604. Archived from the original on 2024-12-25.
- Fotić, Aleksandar (2005). "Belgrade: a Muslim and non-Muslim cultural centre (Sixteenth-Seventeenth centuries)". Provincial Elites in the Ottoman Empire: Helcyon Days in Crete V. Rethymno: Crete University Press. pp. 51–75. Archived from the original on 2025-02-10.
- Fotić, Aleksandar (2008). "Serbian Orthodox Church". Encyclopedia of the Ottoman Empire. New York: Infobase Publishing. pp. 519–520. ISBN 9781438110257.
- Gavrilović, Slavko (1993). "Serbs in Hungary, Slavonia and Croatia in struggles against the Turks (15th-18th centuries)". Serbs in European Civilization. Belgrade: Nova, Serbian Academy of Sciences and Arts, Institute for Balkan Studies. pp. 41–54. ISBN 978-86-7583-015-3.
- Hochedlinger, Michael (2013) [2003]. Austria's Wars of Emergence: War, State and Society in the Habsburg Monarchy, 1683–1797. London & New York: Routledge. ISBN 978-1-317-88793-5.
- Hupchick, Dennis P. (2002). The Balkans: From Constantinople to Communism. New York: Palgrave.
- Ingrao, Charles W. (2000) [1994]. The Habsburg Monarchy, 1618–1815 (2nd ed.). Cambridge: Cambridge University Press.
- Isailović, Neven; Krstić, Aleksandar (2015). "Serbian Language and Cyrillic Script as a Means of Diplomatic Literacy in South Eastern Europe in 15th and 16th Centuries". Literacy Experiences concerning Medieval and Early Modern Transylvania. Cluj-Napoca: George Bariţiu Institute of History. pp. 185–195. Archived from the original on 2022-03-24.
- Jelavich, Barbara (1983). History of the Balkans: Eighteenth and Nineteenth Centuries. Vol. 1. Cambridge University Press.
- Katić, Tatjana (2017). "Administrative Division, Settlements and Demographics in the First Centuries of Ottoman Rule" (PDF). Artistic Heritage of the Serbian People in Kosovo and Metohija: History, Identity, Vulnerability, Protection. Belgrade: Serbian Academy of Sciences and Arts. pp. 41–48. Archived (PDF) from the original on 2025-01-25.
- Katić, Tatjana; Vučetić, Biljana (2017). "In the time of the Ottoman Empire (1455-1912)" (PDF). Artistic Heritage of the Serbian People in Kosovo and Metohija: History, Identity, Vulnerability, Protection. Belgrade: Serbian Academy of Sciences and Arts. pp. 365–377. Archived (PDF) from the original on 2025-01-25.
- Katić, Tatjana (2018). "Walking through the ravaged City: An Eyewitness Testimony to Demolition of the Belgrade Fortress in 1690". Belgrade: 1521-1867. Belgrade: The Institute of History. pp. 79–99. ISBN 978-86-7743-132-7.
- Kursar, Vjeran (2013). "Non-Muslim Communal Divisions and Identities in the Early Modern Ottoman Balkans and the Millet System Theory". Power and Influence in South-Eastern Europe, 16th–19th century. Berlin: LIT Verlag. pp. 97–108. ISBN 9783643903310.
- Miljković, Ema (2010). "The Christian Sipahis in the Serbian Lands in the Second Half of the 15th Century" (PDF). Београдски Историјски Гласник: Belgrade Historical Review. 1: 103–119. Archived (PDF) from the original on 2025-01-08.
- Miljković, Ema (2012). "Ottoman Heritage in the Balkans: The Ottoman Empire in Serbia, Serbia in the Ottoman Empire". Journal of Social Sciences: Sosyal Bilimler Dergisi. Special Issue on Balkans: 129–137. Archived from the original on 2025-04-27.
- Miljković, Ema (2014a). "Toward the Rehabilitation of the Social History of the Serbs During the Ottoman Rule: The Serbian Society in the 15th Century". Human Research in Rehabilitation. 4 (2): 50–52. doi:10.21554/hrr.041402. Archived from the original on 2018-02-24.
- Miljković, Ema (2014b). "The Timar System in the Serbian Lands from 1450 to 1550: With a Special Survey on the Timar System in the Sanjak of Smederevo". Osmanlı Mirası Araştırmaları Dergisi: Journal of Ottoman Legacy Studies. 1 (1): 36–47. Archived from the original on 2024-12-09.
- Miljković, Ema; Strugarević, Svetlana (2015). "The Bridge Between Old and New: The Serbian Society in the First Century of the Ottoman Rule". Studies of the Ottoman Domain. 5 (9): 18–38. doi:10.19039/sotod.2015914106. SSRN 2661965.
- Miljković, Ema (2020). "Everyday Life in The Sanjak of Smederevo During the First Century of the Ottoman Administration: Urban vs. Rural". The Balkans Everyday Life and Culture. Lyon: Livre de Lyon. pp. 1–18. ISBN 978-2-490773-45-9.
- Pavlowitch, Stevan K. (2002). Serbia: The History behind the Name. London: Hurst & Company. ISBN 9781850654773. Archived from the original on 2025-03-11.
- Pešalj, Jovan (2010). "Early 18th-Century Peacekeeping: How Habsburgs and Ottomans Resolved Several Border Disputes after Karlowitz". Empires and Peninsulas: Southeastern Europe between Karlowitz and the Peace of Adrianople, 1699–1829. Berlin: LIT Verlag. pp. 29–42. ISBN 9783643106117.
- Radosavljević, Nedeljko V. (2010). "The Serbian Revolution and the Creation of the Modern State: The Beginning of Geopolitical Changes in the Balkan Peninsula in the 19th Century". Empires and Peninsulas: Southeastern Europe between Karlowitz and the Peace of Adrianople, 1699–1829. Berlin: LIT Verlag. pp. 171–178. ISBN 978-3-643-10611-7.
- Rajić, Suzana (2010). "Serbia - The Revival of the Nation-state, 1804-1829: From Turkish Provinces to Autonomous Principality, 143-148". Empires and Peninsulas: Southeastern Europe between Karlowitz and the Peace of Adrianople, 1699–1829. Berlin: LIT Verlag. pp. 143–148. ISBN 9783643106117.
- Roider, Karl A. (1972a). The Reluctant Ally: Austria's Policy in the Austro-Turkish War, 1737–1739. Baton Rouge: Louisiana State University Press. ISBN 978-0-8071-0237-4.
- Roider, Karl A. (1972b). "The Perils of Eighteenth-Century Peacemaking: Austria and the Treaty of Belgrade, 1739". Central European History. 5 (3): 195–207. doi:10.1017/S0008938900015478. JSTOR 4545635. Archived from the original on 2024-12-07.
- Sotirović, Vladislav B. (2011). "The Serbian Patriarchate of Peć in the Ottoman Empire: The First Phase (1557–94)". Serbian Studies. 25 (2). NASSS: 143–169. doi:10.1353/ser.2011.0038. S2CID 143629322. Archived from the original on 2019-05-06.
- Stavrianos, Leften (2000) [1958]. The Balkans Since 1453. London: Hurst. ISBN 9781850655510.
- Stojkovski, Boris (2015). "Between Habsburgs and Ottomans - Jovan Nenad movement in 1526-1527". Балканот: луѓе, војни и мир. Скопје: Институт за национална историја. pp. 73–82. Archived from the original on 2024-07-19.
- Sugar, Peter F. (1996) [1977]. Southeastern Europe under Ottoman Rule, 1354-1804. Seattle: University of Washington Press. ISBN 978-0-295-80363-0.
- Šuletić, Nebojša (2017). "Under Ottoman Rule: Until the End of the 18th Century". Artistic Heritage of the Serbian People in Kosovo and Metohija: History, Identity, Vulnerability, Protection. Belgrade: Serbian Academy of Sciences and Arts. pp. 31–39. Archived from the original on 2024-07-09.
- Šuletić, Nebojša (2021). "Usurpations of and Designated Successions to the Throne in the Serbian Patriarchate: The Case of Patriarch Moses Rajović (1712-24)" (PDF). Balcanica (52): 47–67. doi:10.2298/BALC2152047S. Archived from the original (PDF) on 2022-02-17.
