= Serb uprising of 1596–1597 =

- Part of the Long Turkish War
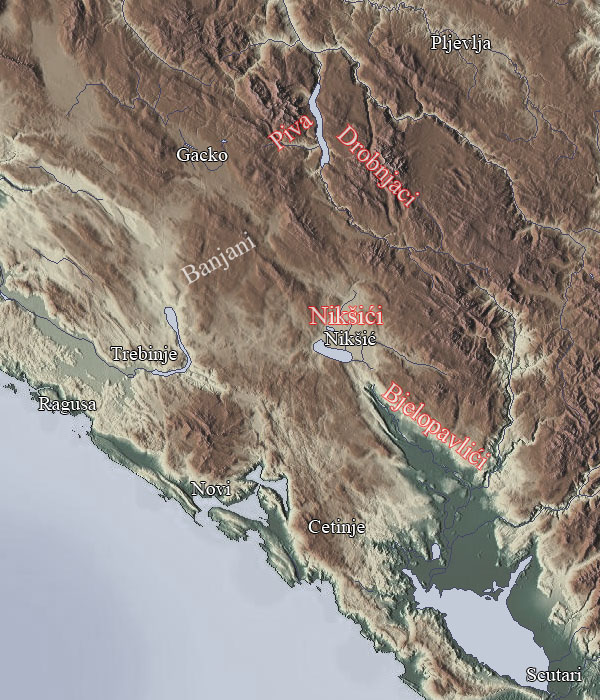
- Map showing the revolting tribes and key towns
Date	Late 1596 – after 10 April 1597
Location	Eastern portion of the Sanjak of Herzegovina and parts of the Montenegro Vilayet
Result	Ottoman victory

Belligerents
Serb rebels: Bjelopavlići; Drobnjaci; Nikšići; Pivljani	Ottoman Empire

Commanders and leaders
Grdan; Organized by Visarion and Jovan Kantul	Dervish Bey

The Serb uprising of 1596–1597, also known as the Herzegovina uprising of 1596–1597, was a rebellion organized by Serbian Patriarch Jovan Kantul (s. 1592–1614) and led by Grdan, the vojvoda ("duke") of Nikšić against the Ottomans in the Sanjak of Herzegovina and Montenegro Vilayet, during the Long Turkish War (1593–1606). The uprising broke out in the aftermath of the failed Banat Uprising in 1594 and the burning of Saint Sava's relics on 27 April 1595; it included the tribes of Bjelopavlići, Drobnjaci, Nikšić, and Piva. The rebels, defeated at the field of Gacko (Gatačko Polje) in 1597, were forced to capitulate due to a lack of foreign support.

== Background ==
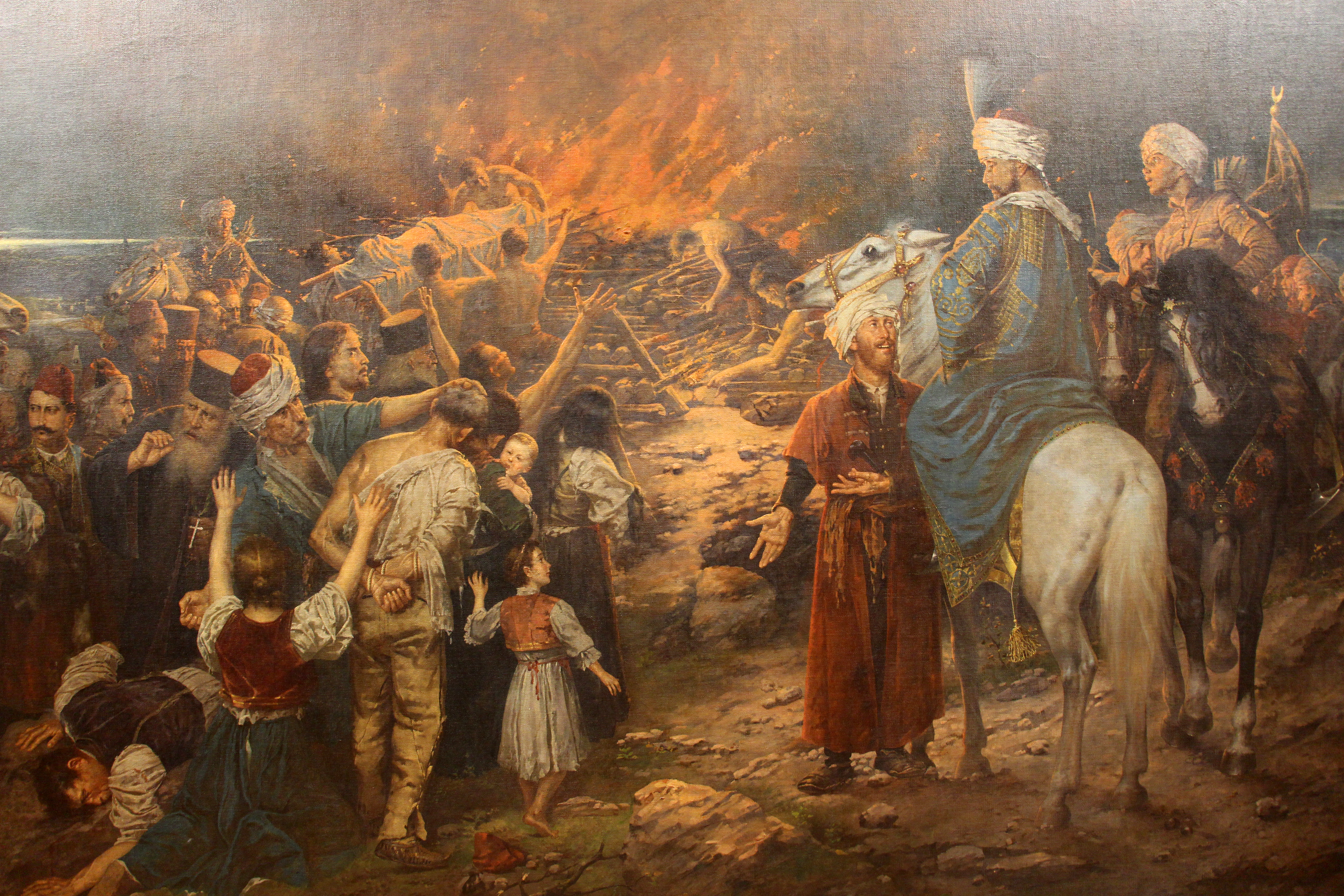
The burning of Saint Sava's remains after the Banat Uprising provoked Serbs in other regions to revolt against the Ottomans.

In early 1594, the Serbs in Banat rose up against the Ottomans. The rebels had, in the character of a holy war, carried war flags with the icon of Saint Sava. The war banners were consecrated by Patriarch Jovan Kantul, and the uprising was aided by Serbian Orthodox metropolitans Rufim Njeguš of Cetinje and Visarion of Trebinje (s. 1590–1602). In response, Ottoman Grand Vizier Koca Sinan Pasha demanded that the green flag of Muhammed be brought from Damascus to counter the Serb flag and ordered that the sarcophagus containing the relics of Saint Sava be removed from the Mileševa monastery and transferred to Belgrade via military convoy. Along the way, the Ottoman convoy killed all the people in its path as a warning to the rebels. The Ottomans publicly incinerated the relics of Saint Sava on a pyre atop the Vračar plateau on 27 April 1595 and had the ashes scattered.

The incineration of Sava's relics provoked the Serbs, and empowered the Serb liberation movement. From 1596, the center of anti-Ottoman activity in Herzegovina was the Tvrdoš Monastery in Trebinje, where Metropolitan Visarion was seated. Many of the Orthodox bishops appealed to the Archduchy of Austria for help in liberating their lands. The Uskoks, irregular soldiers in Habsburg Croatia, supported Austria, being scattered over the whole area between Senj and Ragusa (modern-day Dubrovnik). With a daring raid on 8 April 1596, the Uskoks even managed to occupy the Klis Fortress, though they were unable to hold it. At one point, Austrian officials considered taking military action in Bosnia, where Dalmatian-born Maltese knight Franjo Brtučević was in their service. However, they did not have the strength to fight the Ottomans in Bosnia. Earlier, Austrian forces had gone to great lengths and still barely managed to resist the Ottomans in Hungary.

== Uprising ==
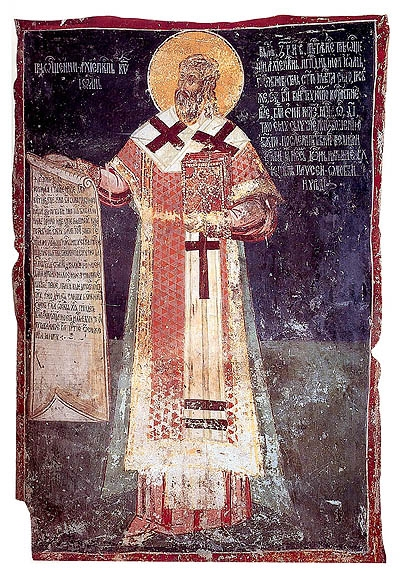
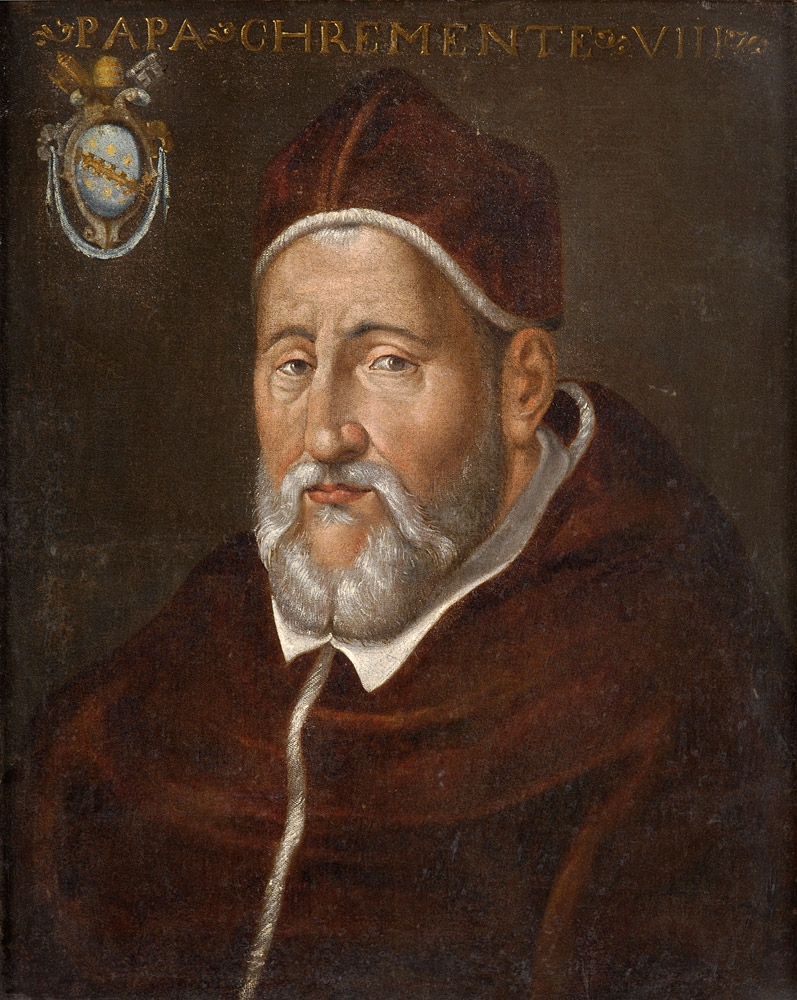
Patriarch Jovan Kantul and Pope Clement VIII

In 1596, the liberation movement spread into Ottoman Montenegro and the neighbouring tribes in Herzegovina, especially those under the influence of Metropolitan Visarion. Of the priests, Patriarch Jovan depended mostly on Visarion, and of the chieftains, mostly on Grdan, the vojvoda ("duke") of Nikšić. A Ragusan document from the beginning of 1596 claimed that the metropolitan and many Herzegovinian chieftains gathered in the Trebinje Monastery where they swore oath "to give up and donate 20,000 heroes to the [Austrian] emperors' light." The rebels sought help from the Austrians, and asked to be handed an Austrian flag to show the Ottomans that they had at least symbolic Austrian support. Shortly thereafter, on 8 April 1596, Klis was captured by the Uskoks, prompting a wave of excitement among Christians from Lika to Herzegovina. At the end of 1596, after the outbreak of the Himara Revolt, Serbs began to rebel against the Ottomans. The uprising, led by Grdan, broke out in Bjelopavlići, then spread to Drobnjaci, Nikšić, Piva, and Gacko. Save for the Brđani, the Montenegrin tribes did not participate in the uprising. At the time, Dervish Bey, the sanjak bey of Montenegro, threatened the Montenegrins through the provveditore ("overseer") of Kotor.

Two Serbian monks, Damjan Ljubibratić and Pavle, were dispatched by Patriarch Jovan Kantul to Pope Clement VIII in 1597. Patriarch Jovan assured the pope of his "loyalty and obedience" to the Church of Rome, and sought help "to liberate the Serb people from the Ottomans". The monks made an exhibition to the papal curia on Serbian history and, among other things, petitioned the pope to send an army to Herceg Novi, which would aid vojvoda Grdan on the land; the tribes of Zupci, Nikšić, Piva, Banjani, Drobnjaci, and Gacko would rise up in arms. From there, they would go to Onogošt (Nikšić), where all chieftains of Montenegro, Dukađin, and the nearby lands, would gather. In the case of action, they could count on 100,000 fighters. It was said that since the Ottomans took Saint Sava from the Serbs "God does not help them any more, Christians kill them from every side". The curia then accused the monks, of "[praying] to God for our Evil." The monks asked the pope, with the support of Serb spiritual and secular leaders, to send a respectable Christian to oversee them.

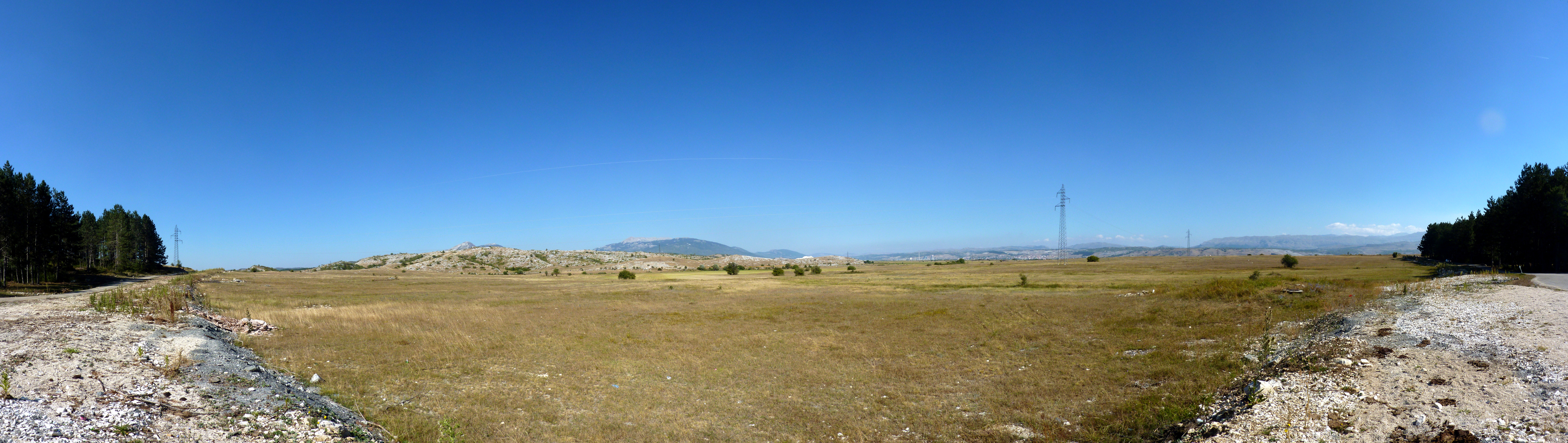
Field of Gacko.

The Archbishop of Ohrid, Atanasije, after his movement had largely failed in Albania, was now in Rome. The Serb uprising had no better luck; the Herzegovinian tribes, Drobnjaci, Nikšić, and Piva began fighting, but were defeated at the field of Gacko (Gatačko Polje) by Dervish Bey sometime in 1597. According to the Venetian Lazzaro Soranzo (1599), the Piperi, Kuči, Klimenti, Bjelopavlići, and others tried to liberate themselves from Ottoman tyranny, and upon hearing the false claim that Sultan Mehmed III lost the battle and his life at the Siege of Eger, "they all rose up under the command of vojvoda Grdan and there was a great slaughter of Turks who were on their land. As I tried to find out more, I heard the contrary, that they unhappily withdrew into their mountains"; Montenegrin historian Gligor Stanojević, based on Soranzo's account, which he described as "the most interesting and most contradicting note on the movement of the Brda and Herzegovina tribes in this time", believed that the rebellion did not have the scale of a national uprising.

[There were] spontaneous uprisings or rebellions which often erupted caused by some event and quickly died away. Such disturbances, insurrections or rebellions took place earlier and later in all parts of the Balkans, and the Turks very quickly and efficiently reacted to them. If those rebellions did not lead to anything, they were another drop of hatred between the conquerors and the people.

— Gligor Stanojević, Jugoslovenske zemlje u mletačko-turskim ratovima XVI–XVIII vijeka

When the talks between the rebels and the papacy led to nothing and no foreign support arrived, the rebels were forced to capitulate to the Ottomans. Ahmed-paša Dugalić, the beylerbey ("governor") of Bosnia, pardoned Grdan of his crimes, and did not even strip him of his lands in Nikšić.

The rebels were challenged before any real action could be realized. Austria was not able to move towards Buda, let alone Bosnia or Serbia; the papal curia did not choose to aid the rebels; and Spain had their own problems. The diplomats—various adventurers, though well-meaning—were amateurs, and had wrongfully and colourfully painted the picture to both sides. To some they promised more than they could do, and to others they presented opportunities as being more mature than they were. Many false reports were made. [The rebels] naïvely thought that the messages and promises they received would give them greater success than they had. The only lesson learnt was for them to be more cautious. The Ottomans, occupied in Hungary, Croatia and the coast, were willing to somewhat leave them alone for the moment being. At this time, none of the prominent leaders in the Ottoman Serb regions were hurt.

— Vladimir Ćorović, Preokret u držanju Srba

== Aftermath and legacy ==
After the failure of the uprising, many Herzegovinians moved to the Bay of Kotor and Dalmatia. The earliest more significant Serb migrations took place between 1597 and 1600. Grdan and Patriarch Jovan would continue to plan revolts against the Ottomans in the coming years. Jovan contacted the pope again in 1599, without success. Serbian, Greek, Bulgarian, and Albanian monks visited European courts to solicit help. The first decade of the 17th century saw some successful Montenegrin battles against the Ottomans under Metropolitan Rufim. The tribe of Drobnjaci defeated the Ottomans in Gornja Bukovica on 6 May 1605. However, Ottomans retaliated the same summer and captured the duke Ivan Kaluđerović, who was eventually taken to Pljevlja and executed. From the assembly in Kosijerevo monastery, on 18 February 1608, Serb leaders urged the Spanish and Neapolitan court for final energetic action. Preoccupied, Spain could not do much in Eastern Europe. However, the Spanish fleet did attack Durrës in 1606. Finally, on 13 December 1608, Patriarch Jovan Kantul organized an assembly in Morača Monastery, gathering all the rebel leaders of Montenegro and Herzegovina. The assembly officially negotiated with Emmanuel I to send a force for the liberation of the Balkans, in exchange for "the Crown of Macedonia", at the same time requesting that Pope Paul grant the Serbian Orthodox Church special privileges. "In our parts," they demanded, "we do not want any Jesuits, or anyone else, who intends on turning the Christian folk to Roman law." Jovan assured him that an army of 20,000, 25 guns, and weapons for 25,000 more to be distributed in the Balkans would overwhelm the Ottoman sultan. After years of planning, nothing concrete resulted in it, because such an operation "required Spanish naval and logistical support". The rebellion slowly faded through 1609 towards the end of 1610. The 1596–97 uprising would stand as a model for multiple anti-Ottoman uprisings in Bosnia and Herzegovina in the coming centuries.

== See also ==
- Holy League of Pope Clement VIII
- First Tarnovo Uprising (1598), in Bulgaria.

== Annotations ==
1. It has been called the Herzegovina Uprising (Serbian: херцеговачки устанак) and Uprising in Herzegovina (Serbian: Устанак у Xерцеговини). Other names include Patriarch Jovan's Uprising (Serbian: устанак патријарха Јована) Grdan's Uprising (Serbian: Грданов устанак) and Grdan's Rebellion (Serbian: Грданова буна).
2. The timespan of the revolt was from the late or end of 1596 until sometime in 1597. In 1599, Lazzaro Soranzo claimed that the rebels rose up during the Siege of Eger, which lasted from 20 September to 12 October 1596. One of Jovan Kantul's petitions to the Pope was presented by his emissaries on 10 April 1597.
