= Dugalić =

Dugalić is a Bosnian surname. Notable people with the surname include:

- Ahmed-paša Dugalić (fl. 1598–1605), Ottoman Bosnian governor
- Angela Dugalić (born 2001), Serbian basketball player
- Esad Dugalić (1947–2011), Bosnian football goalkeeper
- Nebojša Dugalić (born 1970), Serbian actor, theater director and drama professor
- Rade Dugalić (born 1992), Serbian footballer
