= Sanjak of Herzegovina =

Administrative division of the Ottoman Empire

- Sanjak of the Ottoman Empire
- 1470–1833; 1851–1912
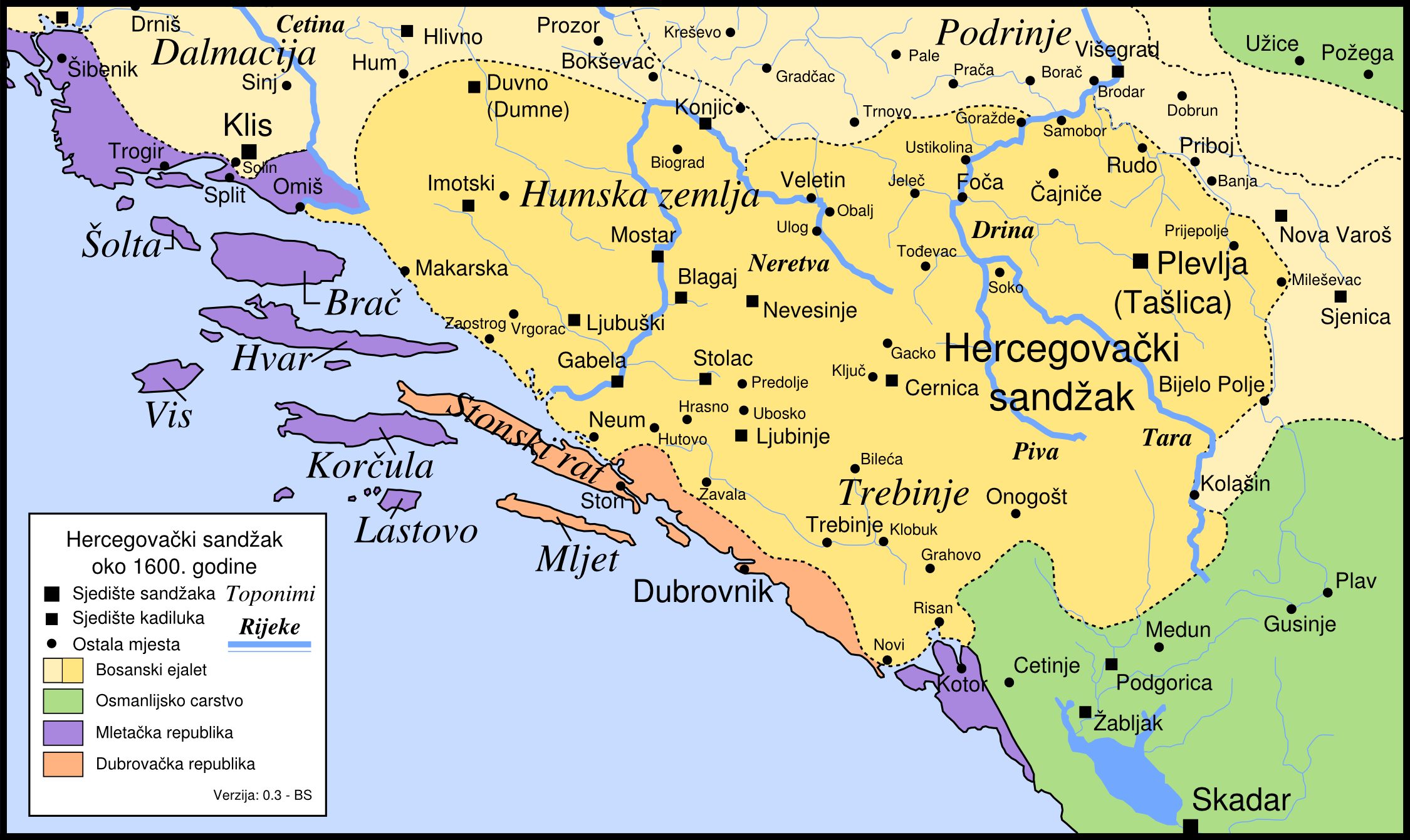
- Map of the Sanjak of Herzegovina
- Capital: Foça (now Foča) (1470–1572); Taşlıca (now Pljevlja) (1572–1833)
- Area
  - Coordinates: 43°21′24″N 19°21′30″E
- History
  - Established: 1470
  - Part of Bosnia Eyalet: 1580
  - Establishment of the Herzegovina Eyalet: 1833
| Preceded by | Succeeded by |
| Duchy of Saint Sava | Herzegovina Eyalet |
- Today part of: Bosnia and Herzegovina; Croatia; Serbia; Montenegro

The Sanjak of Herzegovina (Ottoman Turkish: سنجاق هرسك; Turkish: Hersek Sancağı; Serbo-Croatian: Hercegovački sandžak) was an Ottoman administrative unit established in 1470. The seat was in Foča until 1572 when it was moved to Taşlıca (Pljevlja). The sanjak was initially part of the Eyalet of Rumelia but was administrated into the Eyalet of Bosnia following its establishment in 1580.

== History ==
=== 15th century ===
In November 1481 Ayas, an Ottoman general, attacked Novi and captured it probably at the end of January 1482. The sanjak was established between 1483 and 1485. In 1485, Novi was established as a kadiluk of the sanjak of Herzegovina.

=== 16th century ===
In 1572, the seat of the sanjak was moved from Foča to Pljevlja.

The Banat Uprising (1594) had been aided by Serbian Orthodox metropolitans Rufim Njeguš of Cetinje and Visarion of Trebinje (s. 1590–1602). In 1596 revolts spread into Ottoman Montenegro and the neighbouring tribes in Herzegovina, especially under influence of Metropolitan Visarion. A Ragusan document from the beginning of 1596 claims that many Herzegovinian chieftains with the metropolitan gathered in the Trebjesa Monastery where they swore oath "to give up and donate 20,000 heroes to the emperors' light." In 1596, Grdan, vojvoda of Nikšić, and Serbian Patriarch Jovan Kantul (s. 1592–1614) led rebels against the Ottomans but were defeated on the Gacko Field in 1597 (see Serb Uprising of 1596–97). However, Grdan and Patriarch Jovan would continue to plan revolts against the Ottomans in the coming years.

=== 18th century ===
In 1737, Bogić Vučković and his brothers organized an uprising in Herzegovina during the Austro-Turkish War (1737–39).

=== 19th century ===
At the beginning of the 19th century, the Bosnia Eyalet was one of the least developed and more autonomous provinces of the Empire. In 1831, Bosnian kapudan Husein Gradaščević occupied Travnik, demanding autonomy and the end of military reforms in Bosnia. Ultimately, exploiting the rivalries between beys and kapudans, the grand vizier succeeded in detaching the Herzegovinian forces, led by Ali-paša Rizvanbegović, from Gradaščević's. The revolt was crushed, and in 1833, a new Herzegovina Eyalet was created from the southern part of the Bosnia Eyalet and given to Rizvanbegović as a reward for his contribution in crushing the uprising. This new entity lasted only for a few years, being re-integrated into the Bosnia Eyalet after Rizvanbegović's death (1851).

In March 1852, Ottoman general Omar Pasha decided to disarm the Herzegovinians, which sparked outrage in the region. The chieftain of the Herzegovinians was Luka Vukalović. The refusal of giving up arms resulted in minor fights between Herzegovinians and Turks (local Slavic Muslims), which in turn resulted in an uprising, which Vukalović would lead.

In 1875, an uprising broke out in Herzegovina, led by local Serbs against their Ottoman Bosnian lords who treated them harshly and ignored the new reforms announced by Sultan Abdülmecid I. The rebels were aided with weapons and volunteers from the Principalities of Montenegro and Serbia, whose governments eventually jointly declared war on the Ottomans on 18 June 1876, leading to the Serbo-Turkish War (1876–78) and Montenegrin–Ottoman War (1876–78), which in turn led to the Russo-Turkish War (1877–78) and Great Eastern Crisis. A result of the uprisings and wars was the Berlin Congress in 1878, which gave Montenegro and Serbia independence and territorial expansion, while Austro-Hungary occupied Bosnia and Herzegovina for 30 years, while it still was de jure Ottoman territory. The Austro-Hungarian occupation and Montenegrin expansion of Old Herzegovina marks the end of the Sanjak of Herzegovina.

== Population ==
The 1851 census recorded only the males. Austrian statistician Gustav Thoemmel made a calculation of the total population based on the census and concluded that the Sanjak of Herzegovina had 207,970 inhabitants, of which the majority were Eastern Orthodox Christians, 101,348 or 48.7%, followed by Muslims, 56,000 or 26.9%, and Catholics, 49,217 or 23.7%. According to the 1870 census, the Sanjak of Herzegovina had 230,319 inhabitants, the majority of whom were Muslims, 110,964 or 48.2%, followed by Eastern Orthodox Christians, 66,041 or 28.7% and Catholics, 51,414 or 22.3%.

== Governors ==
- Ayas, conqueror (1478–83)
- Hadim Sinan Pasha, sanjak-bey (1504–06)
- Kasim Bey
- Kara Osman-beg
- Sinan Pasha, sanjak-bey (1547–50)
- Mehmed Bey Obrinović, sanjak-bey (fl. 1550)
- Malkoč-beg, sanjak-bey (1561–63)
- Sinan-beg Boljanić, sanjak-bey between the 1550s and 1570s
- Hüseyin Pasha Boljanić, sanjak-bey (1567–69)
- Sultanzade Mehmed-bey (1586–93)
- Ali Paša Čengić (1654)
- Arnaut Mustafa Pasha (1664)
- Muharem Pasha (1664)
- Sohrab Mehmed Pasha (1665)
- Ćose Ali Pasha (1666)
- Ibrahim Pasha Tešnjak (1667)
- Mustafa-beg (fl. 1702)
- Alija, sanjak-bey (fl. 1718–19)
- Ali-paša Rizvanbegović, Vizier of Herzegovina (1833–51)

== See also ==
- History of Herzegovina
- History of Bosnia and Herzegovina

== Sources ==
- Ingrao, Charles; Samardžić, Nikola; Pešalj, Jovan, eds. (2011). The Peace of Passarowitz, 1718. West Lafayette: Purdue University Press. ISBN 9781557535948.
- Koncul, Antun (2016). Stanovništvo župe Gradac 1709-1718 godine [The population of the Parish of Gradac from 1709-1718] (in Croatian). Zagreb: University of Zagreb.
- Ramčilović, Zećir (2019). "Demografske promjene nakon Berlinskog kongresa (1878) u Bosni i Hercegovini" [Demographic changes in Bosnia and Herzegovina after the Congress of Berlin (1878)]. Historijski Pregledi (in Bosnian). Tuzla: Centar za istraživanje moderne i savremene historije Tuzla.
