= Derviš-beg Alić Sarvanović =

Ottoman governor of Montenegro from 1592 to after 1597

Derviš-beg Alić Sarvanović (Serbian Cyrillic: Дервиш-бег Алић Сарвановић), known as Derviš Alić (Дервиш Алић) or Dervish Bey (Turkish: Derviş Bey) was the Ottoman governor of the sanjak of Montenegro from 1592 to at least 1597. He was from Peć.

In 1592, the Sanjak of Scutari was divided into two parts. Derviš-beg received the sanjak of Montenegro (Ulcinj, Bar and all on the right side of the Bojana river). He had succeeded in dividing the sanjak after bribing the Vizier. He held the title of sanjak-bey, and wrote to the provveditore of Cattaro (Kotor) about his acquisition of the sanjak of Montenegro, and also Paštrovići and Perast which were under Venetian rule.

In 1597 he defeated the Serb rebels led by Grdan at the Gacko field. The Montenegrin tribes did not participate in the uprising, only the Brđani. At the time, Sarvanović threatened the Montenegrins through the provveditore of Kotor.

Political offices
Military offices
Preceded by ?	Sanjak-bey of Montenegro; 1592 – 1597+	Succeeded by ?
