= Patriarch Jovan =

Patriarch Jovan may refer to:

- Jovan I, Patriarch of the Serbs (1508)
- Jovan II, Patriarch of the Serbs (1592–1613)
