= Visarion, Metropolitan of Herzegovina =

Metropolitan Visarion
- Metropolitan of Herzegovina
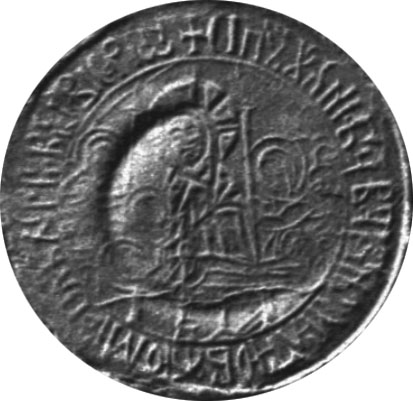
- Visarion's seal, dated 22 May 1596
- Metropolis: Metropolitanate of Herzegovina
- See: Trebinje
- Installed: 1590
- Term ended: 1602
- Predecessor: Savatije Sokolović
- Successor: Silvestar

Personal details
- Born: Unknown Sanjak of Herzegovina, Ottoman Empire
- Died: Unknown
- Denomination: Serbian Orthodox
- Residence: Tvrdoš Monastery in Trebinje

Visarion (Serbian Cyrillic: Висарион) was the Metropolitan of Herzegovina between 1590 and 1602.

He was the ktitor of the Great Church of the Tvrdoš Monastery in Trebinje, where he was seated.

== Life ==
=== Rebel activity ===
The Banat Uprising (1594), in which the Serbs in Banat rose up against the Ottomans, had been aided by Visarion and Metropolitan Rufim Njeguš of Cetinje. The rebels' war flags with the icon of Saint Sava had been consecrated by Serbian Patriarch Jovan Kantul. Ottoman Grand Vizier Koca Sinan Pasha ordered the flag of Muhammad be brought to counter the Serb flag, as well as the sarcophagus and relics of Saint Sava located in the Mileševa monastery be brought by military convoy to Belgrade. Along the way, the Ottomans had people killed in their path so that the rebels in the woods would hear of it. The relics were publicly incinerated by the Ottomans on a pyre on the Vračar plateau, and the ashes scattered, on April 27, 1595.

Among the Serbs, especially after the incineration of the relics of St. Sava, the liberation movement met a large response. The center of action for Herzegovina was since 1596 the Tvrdoš Monastery in Trebinje, where Metropolitan Visarion was seated. Many of the Orthodox bishops called to Austria for help in liberating their lands. In 1596 the liberation movement and fighting would spread into Ottoman Montenegro and the neighbouring tribes in Herzegovina, especially under influence of Metropolitan Visarion. A Ragusan document from the beginning of 1596 claimed that the metropolitan and many Herzegovinian chieftains gathered in the Trebinje Monastery where they swore oath "to give up and donate 20,000 heroes to the [Austrian] emperors' light." The rebels sought help or at least, symbolically, the Austrian flag as a proof of connection with Austria. At the end of 1596, after the Himariote rebellion, the Serbs started to revolt. The uprising broke out in Bjelopavlići, then spread to Drobnjaci, Nikšić, Piva and Gacko, and was led by vojvoda Grdan of Nikšić. The uprising was short-lived, as the rebels were defeated at Gacko. The rebels were forced to capitulate due to lack of foreign support. After the failure of the uprising, many Herzegovinians moved to the Bay of Kotor and Dalmatia. Grdan and Patriarch Jovan would continue to plan revolts against the Ottomans in the coming years.
