= Ahmed Pasha Dugalić =

Ottoman Bosnian governor

Personal details
- Born: Sanjak of Bosnia
- Relations: Malkoč-beg
- Occupation: Beylerbey

Military service
- Allegiance: Ottoman Empire
- Years of service: fl. 1598–1605

Ahmed Pasha Dugalić (Turkish: Ahmet Paşa, Serbo-Croatian: Ahmed-paša Dugalić; fl. 1598–1605) was an Ottoman Bosnian governor of the Bosnia Eyalet (1598–99; 1604) and Temeşvar Eyalet (1605–?). After the Serb Uprising of 1596–97 he made peace with Grdan. He succeeded Dželalija Hasan-paša (who died in Belgrade) as governor of the Temeşvar Eyalet.

== Early life ==
There are insufficient sources alleging that part of the Malkoçoğlu family (Malkočević) received sipahi status in Duge near Prozor, hence their name. Ahmed descended from the Dugalići of Malkoč-beg. The oldest mention of Ahmed is from 1598, when he became beylerbey of Bosnia.

== Career ==
=== Governor of Bosnia (1st term) ===
In 1598, Ahmed-paša Dugalić served as the governor of the Bosnia Eyalet. He succeeded Hasan-paša Tir (s. 1597–98), and served as the beyler-bey of Bosnia, most likely for less than a year, being succeeded in 1599 by Derviš-paša Bajezidagić. Ahmed-paša made peace with Grdan, the leader of the Serb Uprising of 1596–97, and forgave him, doing nothing to Grdan, not even stripping him of his voivodeship of the Nikšić nahija.

=== Governor of Bosnia (2nd term) ===
When Husein-paša left Bosnia in 1604 and became beylerbey of Temeşvar, Ahmed-paša succeeded him in Bosnia. In February 1604, Ahmed-paša Dugalić went from Belgrade to Bosnia to take over the Vizierate of Bosnia.

=== Governor of Temeşvar ===
With the death of Dželalija Hasan-paša in Belgrade in 1605, Ahmed-paša Dugalić succeeded as governor of the Temeşvar Eyalet.

== Annotations ==
- He is also referred to as: Ahmet-paša Kadum (Ахмет-паша Кадум)

Preceded by Hasan-paša Tir	Beylerbey of Bosnia; 1598–99	Succeeded by Derviš-paša Bajezidagić
Preceded by Husein-paša	Beylerbey of Bosnia; 1604–05	Succeeded by ?
Preceded by Dželalija Hasan-paša	Beylerbey of Temeşvar; 1605–?	Succeeded by ?
