= Paštrovići =

Historical tribe and region of Montenegro

The Paštrovići (Serbo-Croatian Cyrillic: Паштровићи, pronounced [pâʃtrovitɕi]; Italian: Pastrovichi or Pastrovicchi) is a historical tribe and region in the Montenegrin Littoral. Paštrovići stretches from the southernmost part of the Bay of Kotor, from the cape of Zavala to Spič. Its historical capital was the island of Sveti Stefan. From 1423 until 1797, it was part of the Republic of Venice with interruptions by the Ottoman Empire. It was part of the Kingdom of Dalmatia from 1815 to 1918, then Yugoslavia, then became part of Montenegro only after World War II. The Paštrovići form one of the three historical tribes of the Montenegrin Littoral, the other two being Krivošije and Mrkojevići.

== Etymology ==
The etymology of the name Paštrovići is unclear. Vukmanović says that the name Paštrović could have been derived from the word pastro, a name which still exists in modern Albanian, being derived from pastër, meaning "clean" in Albanian. Another theory proposes that the name could be related to the Vlach word pastor or paštor, meaning “shepherd” in Latin. Kaser suggests a possible derivation from Slavic pastiri.

== History ==
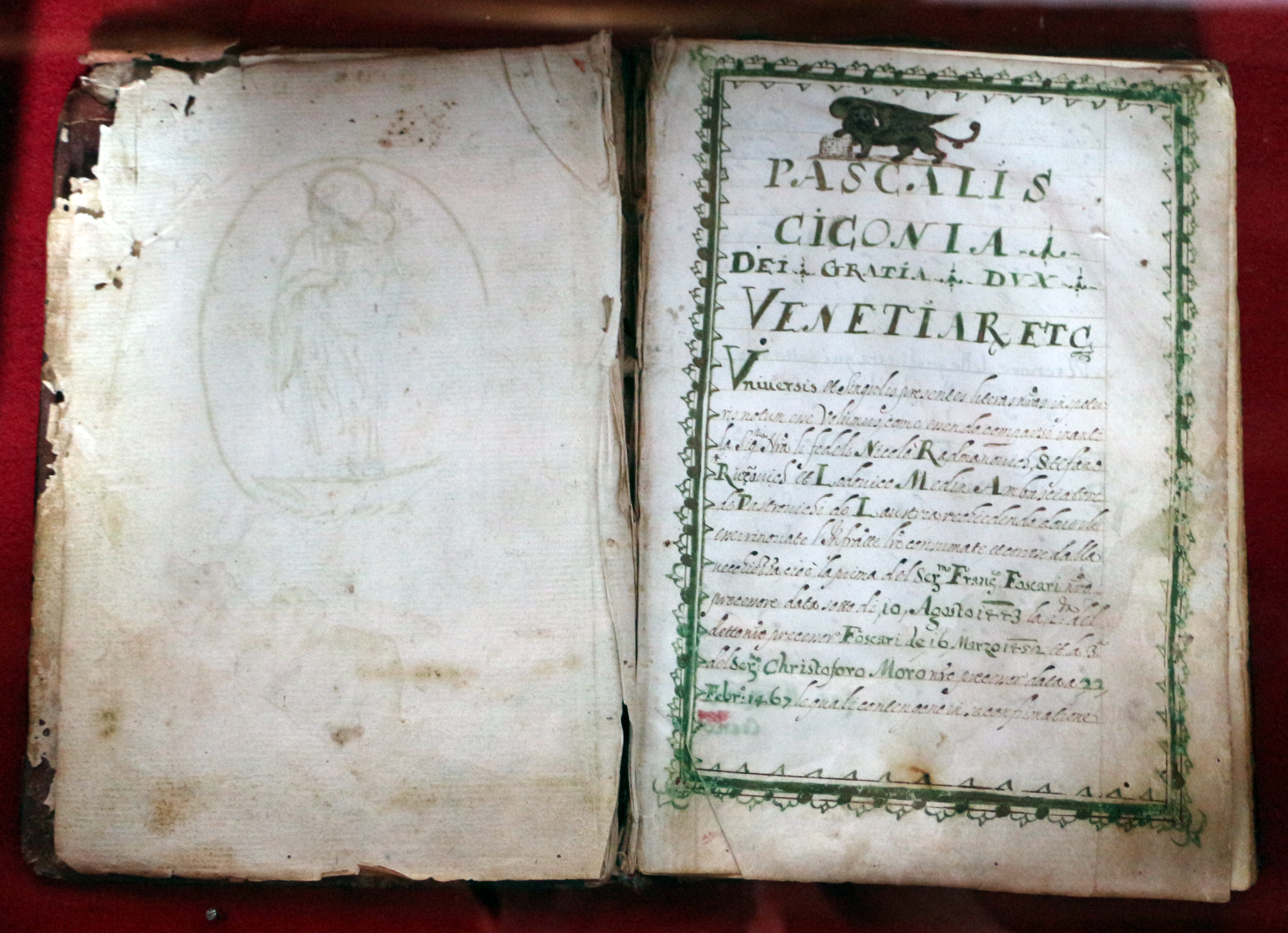
1632 manuscript including Venetian privileges to Paštrovići.

Mayhew and Calić considers them to have been an Albanian tribe, while according to Ćirković, the Paštrovići were Vlachs who had until the middle of the 14th century, been culturally and linguistically Slavicized, a thesis supported by Kaser. According to Vukmanović, the Serbs who settled later took on the name of the Paštrovići clan.

The name is first attested in a text dating to 1355, regarding nobleman Nikolica Paštrović in the service of Serbian emperor Stefan Dušan (r. 1331–55), sent to the Republic of Ragusa. In 1363, Radak Paštrović donated to a church in Rac. Since 1377 they are regularly mentioned in Ragusan documents. In March 1399, several "people from Paštrovići" are mentioned.

During the First Scutari War (1405–13) they were under control of the related Đurašević family whose members held the most prestigious positions on the court of Balša III.

In the Second Scutari War (1419–23) they at first served the Serbian Despotate, until January 1423 when the Republic of Venice managed to bribe them and other tribes in the region over to the Venetian side. Though none of these were mobilized militarily, they left the Serbian ranks and thus became potential danger to Despot Stefan Lazarević. The Paštrović assembly agreed to enter the service of Venice in April 1423, accepting Venetian suzerainty and taxes; in return they received promise to respect their tribal institution, guarantees of their present lands and recognition of their right to lost lands. Peace was signed in August 1423. Thus, by this 1423 treaty, the province of Paštrovići received an autonomous status, while the brotherhoods (families) of Paštrovići became a "tribe", building their free villager estate and internal self-government with kinship organization – becoming petty nobility.

In the Bosnian-Ragusan war for the lands of Konavle, the Ragusan republic hired 200 Albanian mercenaries from Paštrovići (ex Albanensibus de loco Pastrouichi), who along with soldiers from other regions where contracted for a period of 2 months, and were paid 5 perpero per man. In 1445, Venetian supporters in Paštrovići killed a cousin in a blood feud. Afterwards an oath of besa was taken, being soon broken with two people from the murderer’s family being killed. The Venetian administration provided for the victims' families however they did not interfere directly, allowing the Paštrovići to regulate their personal matters in accordance with the Kanun, this being allowed through the legal privileges granted by Venice. The Paštrovići were permitted to use local judicial assemblies for settling and resolving any disputes. Among the leaders of the medieval Paštrovići, a certain comes Progonus is mentioned, Progon being a common Albanian anthroponym.

In the 1582–83 Ottoman defter (tax registry) of the Montenegro Vilayet, an autonomous province of the Sanjak of Scutari, Paštrovići was one of nine nahiya, with 36 villages (out of a total of 148 in the vilayet). In 1592–93, Derviš-beg Alić Sarvanović, the sanjak-bey of Montenegro, also held Paštrovići and Perast. After the battle of Kotor 1657, Governor General Antonio Bernardo continued to support tribe of Paštrovići.

In 16th and 17th century documents, the surname Paštar is found, ie Pastar, which likely refers to the old Paštrović brotherhood. In 1571, the judge Rado Paštar is mentioned, and in 1609 Kristina, daughter of Nikola Pastra, who converted to the Catholic faith. In two places in Glamočko Polje, in Zajaruza and Čukura, live two families of the Pashtra brotherhood.

Paštrovići were part of the Republic of Venice until the fall of Venice in 1797.

== Culture ==
Paštrovići is traditionally Orthodox Christian. In these areas there are many Serbian Orthodox monasteries, and among them: Gradište , Praskvica, Reževići, Duljevo, Stanjevići Monastery and many other churches.

People from Paštrovići were oriented towards maritime trade, and they had a great number of captains and shipowners. The majority of the population was dealing with agriculture and livestock breeding, while in the littoral, salination was developed very well. The earliest pioneers and settlers in North and South America hail from there, particularly during the Ottoman and Napoleonic wars and those that ensued after.

== Notable people ==
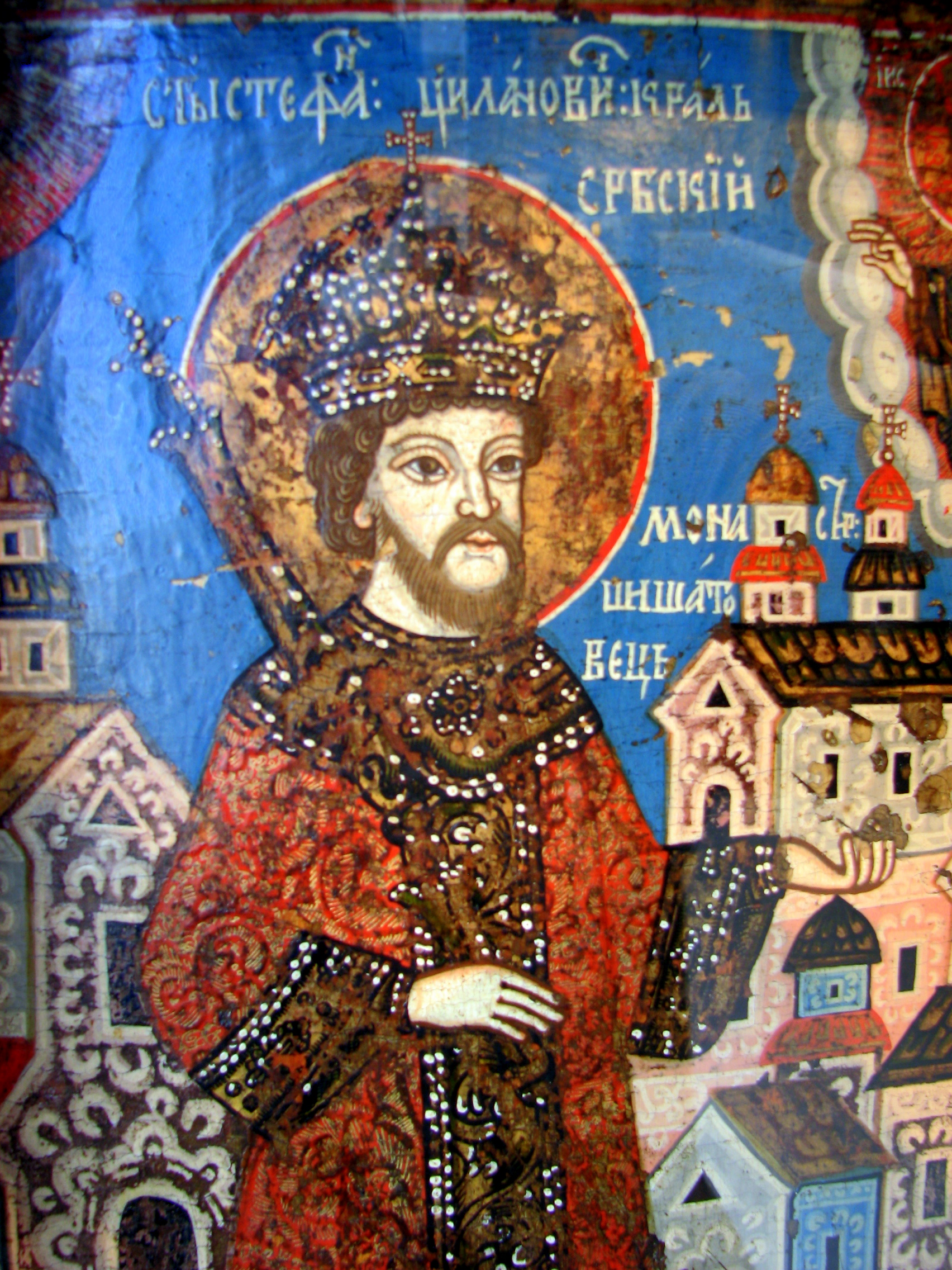
Serb nobleman in Hungarian service, Stefan Štiljanović (fl. 1498–1543), hailed from Paštrovići.

- Stefan Štiljanović, Hungarian nobleman, proclaimed Serbian saint
- Stefan Paštrović, 16th-century publisher of the earliest Serbian primer
- Stefano Zannowich, Serbian writer and adventurer
- Tomo Medin, Serbian writer and adventurer
- Stjepan Mitrov Ljubiša, a writer
- Visarion Ljubiša, Metropolitan of Montenegro
- Rade Andrović, a national hero
- Borko Paštrović, Serbian Chetnik commander during the First Balkan War

== Sources ==
- Čubrilović, Vasa (1983). Odabrani istorijski radovi. Narodna knjiga.
- Fine, John Van Antwerp Jr. (1994). The Late Medieval Balkans: A Critical Survey from the Late Twelfth Century to the Ottoman Conquest. University of Michigan Press. ISBN 978-0-472-08260-5.
- Вукмановић, Јован (1960). Паштровићи: антропогеографско-етнолошка испитивања. Obod.
- Ćirković, Sima (2004). The Serbs. Malden: Blackwell Publishing. ISBN 9781405142915.
- Лукетић, Др Мирослав (2000). Поменик Паштровића I.
- Šekularac, Božidar (2009). "Vlasi na Crnogorskom primorju" (PDF). Matica: časopis za Društvena Pitanja. X (40): 153–162.
