= Esad Dugalić =

Bosnian footballer

Personal information
- Date of birth: 10 January 1947
- Place of birth: Mostar, SFR Yugoslavia
- Date of death: 27 May 2011 (aged 63)
- Place of death: Blagaj, Mostar, Bosnia and Herzegovina
- Height: 1.75 m (5 ft 9 in)
- Position: Goalkeeper

Senior career*
Years	Team	Apps	(Gls)
1964–1966	Velež Mostar	6	(0)
1966	First Vienna	7	(0)
1968–1970	Sloboda Užice	44	(0)
1970–1971	Sarajevo	10	(0)
1971–1973	Osijek	44	(0)
1973–1974	Igman Konjic	27	(0)
1974–1979	Saint-Étienne	1	(0)
1976–1978	→ Saint-Étienne B	29	(0)

International career
	Yugoslavia Olympic	3	(0)
- * Club domestic league appearances and goals

Esad Dugalić (10 January 1947 – 27 May 2011) was a Bosnian football goalkeeper.

== Playing career ==
=== Club ===
Born in Mostar, SR Bosnia and Herzegovina, back then still part of Yugoslavia, he started playing in FK Velež Mostar in the Yugoslav First League, however he spent most of the tim as a substitute goalkeeper, first because of Ivan Ćurković and then because of Enver Marić. That is why he left Velež in and has played in a number of other Yugoslav clubs, namely FK Sloboda Užice, FK Sarajevo, NK Osijek and FK Igman Konjic. In 1974, his former teammate Ćurković arranged him a move to France to play with AS Saint-Étienne. He debuted in the French League 1 in the 1976–77 season, however he spent most of the time playing in the B team. Earlier he had a spell in Austria with First Vienna FC in the 1966–67 season.

=== International ===
He played 3 matches for the Yugoslav Olympic team.

== Managerial career ==
In 1992, he moved to Qatar where he became a coach. He was also the assistant of Džemal Hadžiabdić at Al-Ittihad. He had just had signed a two-year contract to be assistant of Mehmed Baždarević when, unexpectedly, he died on the night of 26–27 May 2011 in his summer house in Blagaj, Mostar while on a visit.
