= Jovan Kantul =

Serbian Patriarch

Jovan
- Archbishop of Peć and Serbian Patriarch
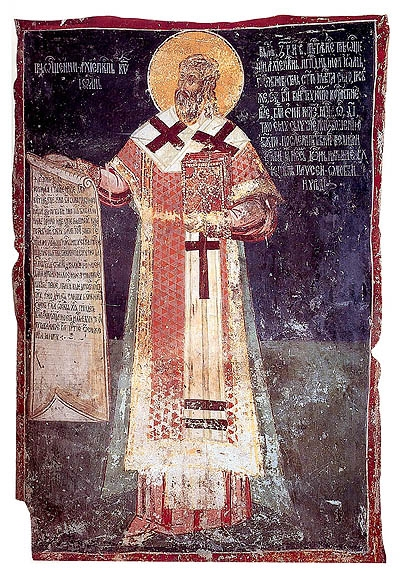
- Fresco depicting Jovan Kantul in the Patriarchate of Peć Monastery
- Church: Serbian Patriarchate of Peć
- See: Patriarchate of Peć Monastery
- Installed: 1592
- Term ended: 1614
- Predecessor: Filip I
- Successor: Pajsije I

Personal details
- Born: Jovan Kantul Ottoman Serbia
- Died: 1614 Istanbul
- Denomination: Eastern Orthodoxy

Jovan Kantul (Serbian Cyrillic: Јован Кантул, fl. 1592 – d. 1614), or Jovan II, was the Patriarch of the Serbian Patriarchate of Peć from 1592 to 1614. He planned a major revolt in the Balkans against the Ottomans, with Grdan, the vojvoda of Nikšić, asking the pope for aid (see Serb Uprising of 1596–97). Owing to his activities for planning a Serbian revolt, he was arrested and put on trial in Istanbul in 1612. He was found guilty of treason and was executed two years later.

== Title ==
- "Archbishop of Peć and Patriarch of all Serbs and Bulgarians and Western Regions" (Јована м. б. архијепископа пећког и свим Србљем и Бугаром и западним странам патријарха), 20 July 1611.

== See also ==
- List of heads of the Serbian Orthodox Church

Eastern Orthodox Church titles
Preceded by Filip I	Serbian Patriarch; 1592–1614	Succeeded by Pajsije I

== Sources ==
- Ćirković, Sima (2004). The Serbs. Malden: Blackwell Publishing. ISBN 9781405142915.
- Fotić, Aleksandar (2008). "Serbian Orthodox Church". Encyclopedia of the Ottoman Empire. New York: Infobase Publishing. pp. 519–520. ISBN 9781438110257.
- Kašić, Dušan, ed. (1965). Serbian Orthodox Church: Its past and present. Vol. 1. Belgrade: Serbian Orthodox Church.
- Pavlovich, Paul (1989). The History of the Serbian Orthodox Church. Serbian Heritage Books. ISBN 9780969133124.
- Слијепчевић, Ђоко М. (1962). Историја Српске православне цркве (History of the Serbian Orthodox Church). Vol. књ. 1. Минхен: Искра.
- Sotirović, Vladislav B. (2011). "The Serbian Patriarchate of Peć in the Ottoman Empire: The First Phase (1557–94)". Serbian Studies: Journal of the North American Society for Serbian Studies. 25 (2): 143–169. doi:10.1353/ser.2011.0038. S2CID 143629322.
- Вуковић, Сава (1996). Српски јерарси од деветог до двадесетог века (Serbian Hierarchs from the 9th to the 20th Century). Београд: Евро.
