= Grdan =

Serb who led uprisings against the Ottomans

vojvoda Grdan
- Born: ca. 1570; Nikšić, Sanjak of Herzegovina, Bosnia Eyalet, Ottoman Empire (now Montenegro)
- Died: 1612
- Military career
- Allegiance: Jovan Kantul, Patriarch of Peć
- Service years: fl. 1596–1612
- Rank: vojvoda (duke)
- Commands: Rebel army

Grdan (Serbian Cyrillic: Грдан; fl. 1596–d. 1612) was the vojvoda (duke) of the Nikšić nahija, part of the Sanjak of Herzegovina (Ottoman Empire), who led several uprisings against the Ottomans in between 1596 and 1612, alongside Serbian Patriarch Jovan Kantul (s. 1592–1614).

== Life ==
=== Origin ===
Grdan was part of the Nikšić tribe. The tribe had originated from Nikša, who was the son of ban Ilijon of Grbalj and maternally a Nemanjić. Nikša had moved to what is now Nikšić Municipality directly after the death of Serbian Emperor Stefan Dušan (1355), his relative. From Nikša sprung a powerful tribe, which gave its name to the old župa (county) of Onogošt. Nikšić was conquered by the Ottomans and was organized into the Ottoman Sanjak of Herzegovina in the late 15th century. Grdan was the vojvoda (duke) of the Nikšić nahija. The "vojvoda"-title had been established after conflicts within the tribe as a compromise.

=== Uprising of 1596–97 ===
The Orthodox Christians in the Balkans sought the right moment to revolt against the Ottomans. Serbian, Greek, Bulgarian and Albanian monks visited European courts for help. The crushed Banat Uprising (1594) had been aided by Serbian Orthodox metropolitans Rufim Njeguš of Cetinje and Visarion of Trebinje (s. 1590–1602). In 1596 revolts would spread into Ottoman Montenegro and the neighbouring tribes in Herzegovina, especially under influence of Metropolitan Visarion. Visarion and the chieftains in Herzegovina asked the Pope for help. A Ragusan document from the beginning of 1596 claims that many Herzegovinian chieftains with the metropolitan gathered in the Trebinje Monastery where they swore oath "to give up and donate 20,000 heroes to the emperors' light." Grdan and the rebels were defeated on the Gacko Field sometime in 1597. The rebels then made peace with the Ottomans; Grdan accepted the Ottoman proposal of peace, in talks with Ahmed Pasha Khadum (Ahmet-paša Kadum), who forgave him. The Beylerbey of Bosnia did nothing to him, not even stripping him of his voivodeship in Nikšić nahija. However, he and Patriarch Jovan would continue to plan revolts against the Ottomans in the coming years.

=== 1607–12 ===
In 1607, Patriarch Jovan Kantul negotiated with Emanuel I to be sent a force for the liberation of the Balkans, in exchange for "the Crown of Macedonia". Jovan assured him that an army of 20,000, 25 guns and weapons for 25,000 more to be distributed in the Balkans would overwhelm the Ottoman sultan. After years of planning, nothing concrete resulted in it, because such an operation "required Spanish naval and logistical support".

Grdan and Patriarch Jovan continued contact with the successor of Pope Clement, Pope Paul V (s. 1605—1621), with the intention to establish a Christian league against the Ottoman Empire. The rebels asked Austria and the Imperial Spanish Kingdom of Naples for aid, in vain. In March 1608, after the assembly at the Kosijerevo monastery, Grdan, the chieftains of Herzegovina and Patriarch Jovan II sent a letter to Spanish king Emanuel I, supporting his liberation plans. In April 1608, at the assembly held at the Morača monastery, the rebels sent a letter to Pope Paul V, encouraging him to influence the Spanish decision to aid them. In the next assembly at Morača, held December 13, 1608, the chieftains (of South Herzegovina, Brda, Old Montenegro, Zadrima and Metohija) proclaimed the Duke of Savoy for their only king and lord. However, the Spanish court, having other plans in the West and being threatened by the Republic of Ragusa and the Ottoman Navy, did not want to start a crusade war in the Balkans.

In 1610 and again in 1612, Vincenzo Gonzaga, Duke of Mantua sent envoys to Dalmatian coast near Ragusa (Dubrovnik), to meet with Serb and Montenegrin chieftains. Grdan died in 1612, and he was succeeded as vojvoda of Nikšić by his son Jovan. With the death of Grdan (1612) and the subsequent imprisonment of Jovan Kantul at Istanbul, Gonzaga never aided in revolt.

== Aftermath ==
After Grdan, the title went to his sons and relatives throughout the 17th century. Nikša's descendants are the Jovanović brotherhood, a branch of the Nikšić tribe.

== Annotations ==
- Grdan Nikšić (Грдан Никшић)
