= Montenegro vilayet =

Ottoman subdivision

Montenegro Vilayet Vilâyeti Karadağ
- Vilayet of the Ottoman Empire
- 1528–1697
- Flag
- Demonym: Montenegrin
- History
  - Established: 1528
  - Disestablished: 1697
Preceded by	Succeeded by
Sanjak of Montenegro	Prince-Bishopric of Montenegro
- Today part of: Montenegro

The Vilayet of the Black Mountain (or Montenegro Vilayet) was an Ottoman administrative unit within the Sanjak of Scutari, consisting of parts of modern-day Montenegro. It was established in 1528 and existed until 1697. Although claimed by the Ottomans, the area was de facto independent with the Montenegrin tribes, with the support of the Metropolitanate of Cetinje, constantly waging wars against Turks.

== Etymology ==
In Ottoman Turkish, it was known as the "Vilayet of the Black Mountain" (vilâyet-i Kara Dağ or "Vilâyeti Karadağ"; Serbo-Croatian: вилајет Црна Гора, vilajet Crna Gora). However, for simplicity it is frequently referred to as the "Montenegro Vilayet."

The bishops of Cetinje used the term "land (zemlja) of the Black Mountain (Crne Gore)".

== Background ==
The greater part of the Zetan principality lost its status as an independent state, becoming a vassal state of the Ottoman Empire, until it was added to the Sanjak of Scutari in 1499. In 1514 this territory was separated from the Sanjak of Scutari and established as a separate Sanjak of Montenegro, under the rule of Skenderbeg Crnojević. When he died in 1528, the Sanjak of Montenegro was joined to the Sanjak of Scutari, as a unique administrative unit with certain degree of autonomy.

== History ==
The 1582–83 census registered that the vilayet, an autonomous part of the frontier of the Sanjak of Scutari, had the nahiyah of Grbavci (13 villages), Župa (11 villages), Malonšići (7 villages), Pješivci (14 villages), Cetinje (16 villages), Rijeka (31 villages), Crmnica (11 villages), Paštrovići (36 villages) and Grbalj (9 villages); a total of 148 villages.

The Montenegrin tribes, with support of the Serbian Orthodox Eparchy of Cetinje, fought guerilla wars against the Ottomans with some degree of success. Although the Ottomans continued to nominally rule the country, the mountains were said to have never been completely conquered. There existed tribal assemblies (zbor). The head bishop (and tribal leaders) often allied themselves with the Republic of Venice. The Montenegrins fought and won two important battles at Lješkopolje, in 1604 and 1613, under the leadership and command of Metropolitan Rufim Njeguš. This was the first battle, of many, that a bishop had led, and managed to defeat the Ottomans.

During the Great Turkish War, in 1685, Suleiman, Pasha of Scutari, led a contingent that approached Cetinje, and on the way clashed with hajduks in Venetian service under the command of Bajo Pivljanin at the hill of Vrtijeljka (in the Battle of Vrtijeljka), where they annihilated the hajduks. Afterwards, the victorious Ottomans paraded with 500 severed heads through Cetinje, and also attacked the Cetinje monastery and the palace of Ivan Crnojević.

The Montenegrins expelled the Ottomans and asserted independence after the Great Turkish War (1683–1699).

== Demographic history ==
- 1521
- 1523: seven nahia.
- 1570
- The census of 1582–83 registered the "vilayet of the Black Mountain" (vilayet-i Kara Dağ) as a separate administrative unit within the Sanjak of Scutari. The vilayet consisted of the following nahiyah, with number of villages: Grbavci with 13 villages, Župa with 11, Malonšići with 7, Pješivci with 14, Cetinje with 16, Rijeka with 31, Crmnica with 11, Paštrovići with 36 and Grbalj with 9 villages, which brings the total number of villages to 148.
- 1592 list by monk. A total of 40 villages in Montenegro (Old Montenegro), divided administratively by knežine. Katun nahia had 10 villages. Compared with the 1521 and 1523 censuses, the borders changed only north of Momišić in Zeta. Information is very scarce, and only gain importance when compared to Bolizza's data.
- Marino Bizzi's 1610 report.
- The vilayet was extensively described in Mariano Bolizza's Relazione e descrizione del sangiacato di Scutari (1614), which contains the earliest description about the people and geography of modern era Montenegro. Montenegro paid an annual tribute.

== Cultural history ==
=== Buildings ===
These include buildings known to have been built between 1528 and 1697.

Ottoman buildings

- Clock Tower (Podgorica), built in 1667

Orthodox monasteries and churches

- Dobrilovina Monastery, rebuilt in 1594
- Ostrog monastery, built in 1665
- Piva Monastery, built in 1573

== Governors ==
- Skenderbeg Crnojević (1514–28)
- Derviš-beg Sarvanović (fl. 1592–97)
