= Branković family tree =

This is a family tree of the Branković dynasty, which ruled the Serbian Despotate from 1427 to 1459, and descendants of members of the Branković family until the 16th century.

family tree of the Branković dynasty

Mladen (d. ~1326); Serb lord in Trebinje and Dračevica
Branko Mladenović (d. a. 1371); Serb lord in the Lake Ohrid region	Ratislava (mother of Nikola Altomanović)
Nikola Radonja (d. 1399)	Grgur Golubić (d. a. 1398)	Vuk Branković (d. ~1398); Serbian regional lord in Kosovo	Mara (d. ~1425) daughter of Prince Lazar of Serbia
Grgur Branković (d. 1408)	Lazar Vuković (d. 1410)	Đurađ Branković (~1375-1456); Despot of Serbia (1427-1456)	Irene Kantakouzene (1400- 1457)
Lazar Branković (~1425-1458); Despot of Serbia (1456-1458)	Grgur Branković (~1425-1459)	Stefan Branković (~1425-1476); Despot of Serbia (1458-1459)	Teodor Branković (~1415-1429)	Catherine Cantacuzena Brankonić (~1418-1492)	Mara (~1420-1487)
Helena (1430-1473) daughter of Thomas Palaiologos, Despot of the Morea	Jelisaveta	Angelina (daughter of George Arianiti, an Albanian lord)	Ulrich II (~1407-1456); Count of Celje	Murad II (1404-1451); Ottoman Sultan
Irina	Milica (1448-1464)	Helena Maria (1447-1498); Despoina of Serbia and Queen of Bosnia	Vuk Grgurević (d. 1485) titular Despot of Serbia (1471-1485)	Marija (1466-1495)	Đorđe Branković (1461-1516) titular Despot of Serbia (1486-1496); Archbishop of Belgrade	Jovan Branković (~1465-1502) titular Despot of Serbia (1496-1502)	Milica (Despina) (b.1464))	Herman of Celje (1439-1452)	Elizabeth of Celje (1441-1455)	Katarina of Celje (1441-1441, Elizabeth's twin)	Albert of Celje (died young in 1448)	Georg of Celje (1444 - 1445)
John Kastrioti (son of Skanderbeg)	Leonardo III Tocco (d. ~1499); Despot of Epirus	Stephen Tomašević (~1438-1463); King of Bosnia (1461-1463); Despot of Serbia (1459)	Barbara of the House of Frankopan	Boniface III (1426-1494); Marquess of Montferrat	Isabella del Balzo	Jelena (d. after 1529) of the Jakšić noble family	Neagoe Basarab; Lord of Wallachia	Matthias Corvinus (1443-1490); King of Hungary
Carlo III Tocco (1464-1518) titular Despot of Epirus	Andronika Arianiti	William IX (1486-1518); Marquess of Montferrat	John George (1488-1533); Marquess of Montferrat	Peter IV Rareș (1487-1546); Lord of Moldavia	Jelena (d. after 1552)	Ferdinand Frankopan (d. ~1527)	Marija (d. 1540)	Maria Magdalena (d. after 1571)	Iwan Wiśniowiecki (d. ~1542)	Hanna (d. 1578)	Fiodor Sanguszko (d. ~1548); Marshal of Volhynia
Ilie II Rareş (~1531-1562); Lord of Moldavia	Ştefan VI Rareş (d. 1552); Lord of Moldavia	Constantin (d. 1554)	Ruxandra (d. 1570)	Alexandru Lăpușneanu (d. 1561); Lord of Moldavia	Catherine (d. 1561)	Nikola Šubić Zrinski (1508-1566); Ban of Croatia	Stephen Frankopan (d. 1575)	Andrej Wiśniowiecki (d. 1586); Voivode of Volhynia	Dymitr Sanguszko (d. 1554)	Roman Sanguszko (d. 1571); Field Hetman of Lithuania

Notes:
- The boxes with a blue border represent members of the Branković family. The tilde (~) means "approximately".
