= Radonjić (surname) =

- Pronunciation: [rǎdoɲitɕ]
- Language: Serbian

Origin
- Origin: derived from given name Radonja
- Meaning: rad which means "labour"

Other names
- Alternative spelling: Serbian Cyrillic: Радоњић
- Anglicisation: Radonjich
- See also: Radonić

Radonjić (Serbian Cyrillic: Радоњић) is a Serbian surname, a patronymic derived from the given name Radonja.

Notable people with the surname include:

- Andrea Radonjić (born 1994), Montenegrin beauty pageant titleholder who was crowned Miss Montenegro Universe 2011 and represented her country in the 2012 Miss Universe
- Dejan Radonjić (born 1970), Montenegrin former professional basketball player and current head coach
- Dejan Radonjić (footballer, born 2005), Austrian football defender
- Goran Radonjić (born 1983), Montenegrin heavyweight kickboxer, captain of Montenegrin kickboxing team
- Jovan Radonjić (1748–1803), guvernadur of Montenegro between 1764 and 1803
- Kristina Radonjić (born 1974), Serbian rhythmic gymnast who competed as Independent Olympic Participant at the 1992 Summer Olympics
- Miljko Radonjić (1770–1836), Serbian writer, professor at the Belgrade Higher School and politician
- Nemanja Radonjić (born 1996), Serbian football forward who plays for Olympique de Marseille
- Nenad Radonjić (born 1996), Serbian football forward who plays for Radnički Beograd, on loan from Voždovac
- Srđan Radonjić (born 1981), Montenegrin former professional footballer who played as striker
- Staniša Radonjić (1650s–1720s), Serbian Orthodox priest, chieftain vojvoda of the Njeguši tribe, and serdar of the Prince-Bishopric of Montenegro
- Stanislav Radonjić (1690–1758), vojvoda, serdar and the first guvernadur (governor) of the Prince-Bishopric of Montenegro from 1756 until he died in 1758, serving Metropolitan Sava II Petrović-Njegoš
- Vladan Radonjić (born 1979), Serbian professional strength and conditioning coach
- Vukolaj Radonjić (1765–1832), last Montenegrin guvernadur
