= Teodora Branković =

14th century Serbian noblewoman and Princess consort of Albania

- Princess of Albania; Lady of Durrës
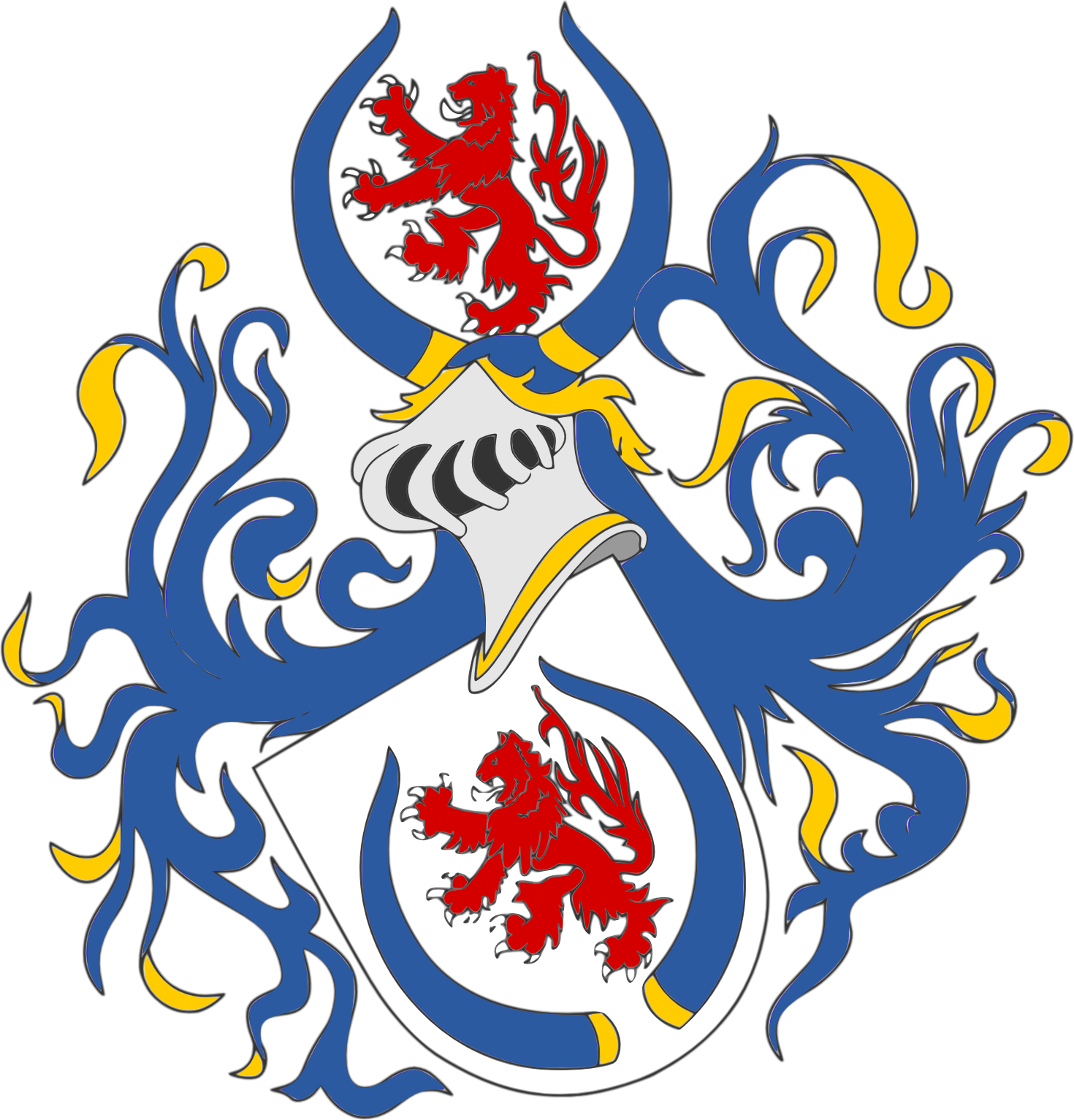

Princess consort of Albania
- Tenure: 1388-1392
- Predecessor: Voisava Balsha
- Born: c. after 1345; Serbian Empire
- Died: unknown
- Spouse: Gjergj Thopia
- Dynasty: Branković (by birth); Thopia (by marriage)
- Father: Branko Mladenović
- Religion: Serbian Orthodox Christianity

Teodora Branković (c. mid 1300s), also known as Theodora, Vojislava or Voisaava was a Serbian noblewoman and Princess of Albania and Lady of Durrës by marriage to Gjergj Thopia. Her father was Sevastokrator Branko Mladenović, founder of the Branković dynasty.

== Early life ==
Teodora was the only daughter, and likely the youngest child, of Branko Mladenović, a Serbian magnate and sevastokrator serving emperors Stefan Dušan (r. 1331–55), and Stefan Uroš V (r. 1355–71). Her mother, on the other hand is unknown. She had three older brothers: Nikola, Grgur and Vuk Branković. The latter would go on to become the most powerful de facto ruler of late 14th century Serbia. Teodora's paternal grandfather, Mladen, is the earliest known predecessor of the Branković, who in later chronicles were mentioned as descendants of the Nemanjić dynasty, through Vukan Nemanjić, son of Stefan Nemanja.

== Princess of Albania ==
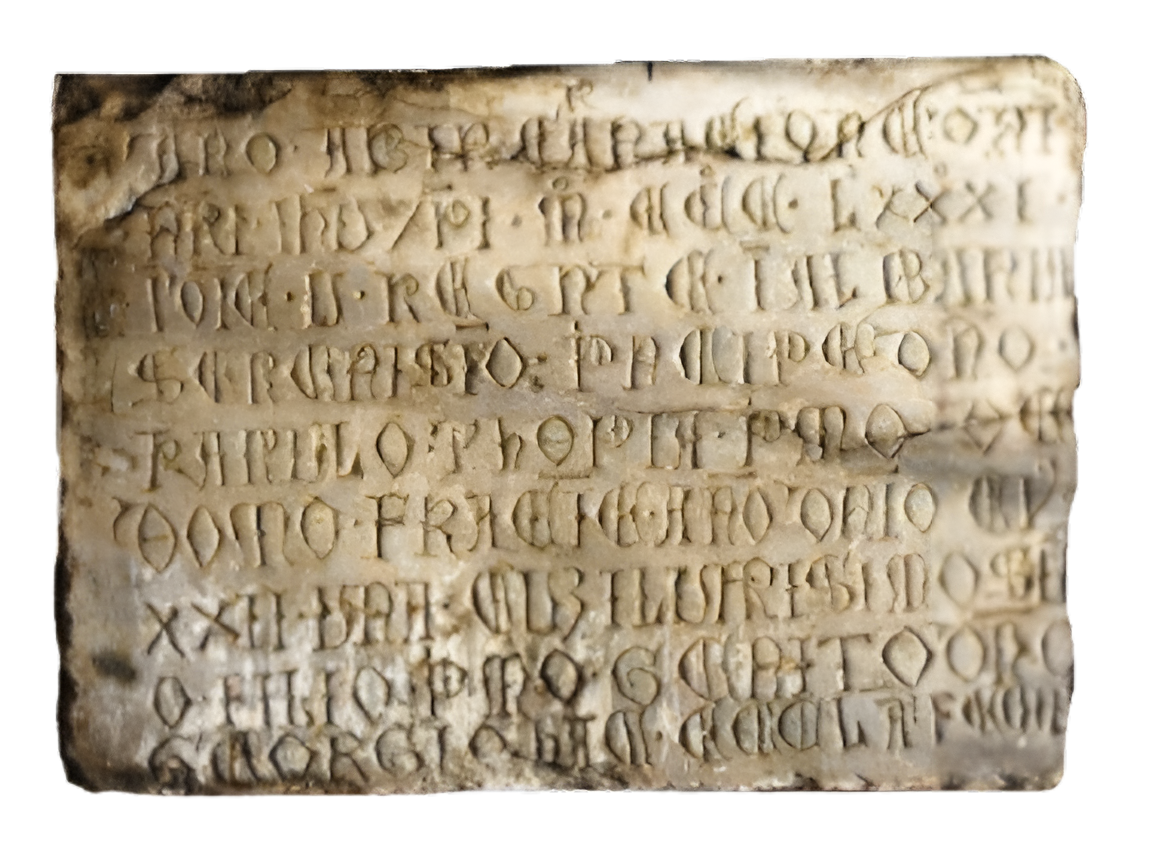
An inscription from St. Jovan Vladimir's Church records Gjergj, husband of Teodora, as the most illustrious firstborn son of Prince Karl Thopia.

Teodora married Gjergj Thopia, Prince of Albania, but the exact date of their marriage remains unknown. The Thopia were a powerful Albanian noble family, who rose into prominence under the reign of Karl Thopia, Gjergj's father. He defeated and took over Angevin controlled territories in Albania, most notably the Duchy of Durrës, at the time held by his cousin Joanna of Durazzo. Through Karl's mother Hélène of Anjou, all later members of the Thopia were related to the Anjou dynasty. After her father-in law's death in 1388, Teodora's husband Gjergj, inherited the titles Prince of Albania and Lord of Durrës, thus making her a Princess consort. The city of Kruja, on the other hand, was inherited by her sister-in law Helena, as per Karl's wishes. During their reign, they were documented of possessing a golden crown and four pairs of pearl earrings as well as a crown decorated with pearls and precious stones. When Gjergj died in 1392, his possessions were passed down to Helena and her Venetian husband, Marco Barbarigo. This led to continuous territorial conflicts with their half-brother Niketa Thopia. After her husband's death, Teodora's life remains a mystery caused by a lack of historical sources. She had no surviving issue by Gjergj.
