= Radonić =

Radonić may refer to:

- Radonić (surname)
- Radonić, Drniš, a village in the city of Drniš, Croatia
- Radonić, Šibenik, a village in Croatia
- Radonić Lake, a lake in Kosovo

== See also ==
- Radonjić (disambiguation)
- Radenić
