= Rudonja =

Rudonja is a Slovenian surname. Notable people with the surname include:

- Mladen Rudonja (born 1971), Slovenian footballer
- Roy Rudonja (born 1995), Slovenian footballer, son of Mladen

== See also ==
- Radonja
