= Guvernadurica =

Prison in Montenegro

Guvernadurica, or Gubernadurica, is the dungeon in the monastery of Cetinje, Montenegro, which is named after the first political prisoner, the last gubernadur of Montenegro, Vukolaj Radonjić.

== History ==
The first prisoner to be held in Guvernadurica was Vukolaj Radonjić, in 1832, who was originally sentenced to death along with his brother Marko Radonjic, later changed to imprisonment.

Andrija Radović was held in Guvernadurica following his attempt to overthrow the Montenegrin monarchy. Following Radovic's sentencing, he was imprisoned.

Towards the end of the 19th century, prisoners held in Guvernadurica had their pictures taken by French photographer, P. Boron. These pictures were later published in Paris in 1888.

== Description ==
Guvernadurica had no doors. However, they were kept unarmed, which was part of the punishment. The belief was that if prisoners attempted to escape, they would be seen unarmed, which would be as humiliating. Prisoners were fed by their family.

The Guvernadurica was used as a prison for political prisoners until the end of World War II.
