= Radonja =

- Gender: male
- Language: Serbian

Origin
- Meaning: labor

Other names
- Derived: rad which means "labour"

Radonja (Serbian Cyrillic: Радоња) is a masculine Serbian given name. It is derived from the adjective rad which means 'willing', 'eager', 'keen'. Patronymic surname Radonjić or Radončić/Radonjičić is derived from Radonja.

In the 1455 survey of the Branković district on Metohija and Kosovo there were 212 men whose name was Radonja.

People

- Nikola Radonja (fl. 1366-1399), Serbian nobleman
- Radonja Petrović (1670–1737), Serbian military leader

== See also ==
- Radonjić (disambiguation), surname and toponym
- Radoinja, village in western Serbia
- Radonjica, village in southern Serbia
- Radunje, village in southern Serbia
- Radunia River in Poland
- Radunia Mountain in Poland
- Radič, given name
