= Gjergj Thopia =

Prince of Albania from 1388 to 1392

Gjergj Thopia Gjergj Topia
- Prince of Albania; Lord of Durrës
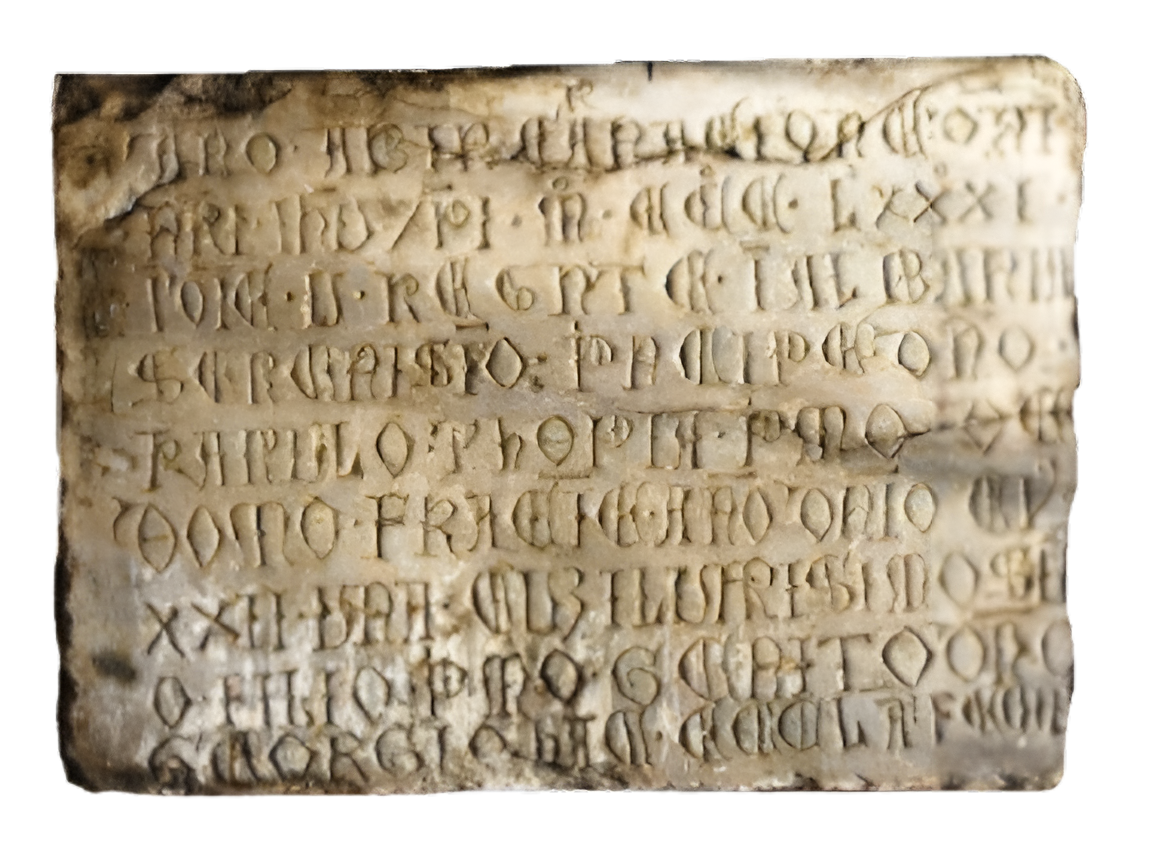
- An inscription from St. Jovan Vladimir's Church records Gjergj as the most illustrious firstborn son of Prince Karl Thopia and commemorates their joint construction of the church in 1381

Prince of Albania
- Reign: January 1388 – 26 October 1392
- Predecessor: Karl Thopia
- Successor: Helena Thopia (inherited the bulk of his holdings); Voisava Thopia (inherited a smaller portion of his holdings)

Lord of Durrës
- Reign: January 1388 – 26 October 1392
- Predecessor: Karl Thopia
- Successor: Title abolished (Relinquished to Venice)
- Born: c. 1370; Principality of Albania
- Died: 26 October 1392; Durrës, Principality of Albania
- Spouse: Teodora Branković
- House: Thopia
- Father: Karl Thopia
- Mother: Voisava Balsha
- Religion: Roman Catholic

Gjergj Thopia (Albanian: Gjergj Topia; c. 1370 – October 1392), also known as Gjergj II, Giorgio, Georg, Georgii or George was an Albanian Prince and member of the Thopia family. He was the Prince of Albania and the Lord of Durrës from 1388 to 1392. His reign was marked by efforts to maintain control of his territories amidst increasing Ottoman pressure and internal rivalries with other Albanian noble families. Gjergj allied with Venice to protect Durrës but ultimately relinquished the city to Venetian rule due to declining health and political instability. Gjergj's death in 1392 marked the end of his lineage, with his holdings passing to his sister, Helena Thopia, and his legacy shaped by his alliances and resistance to Ottoman encroachment.

== Early life and reign ==
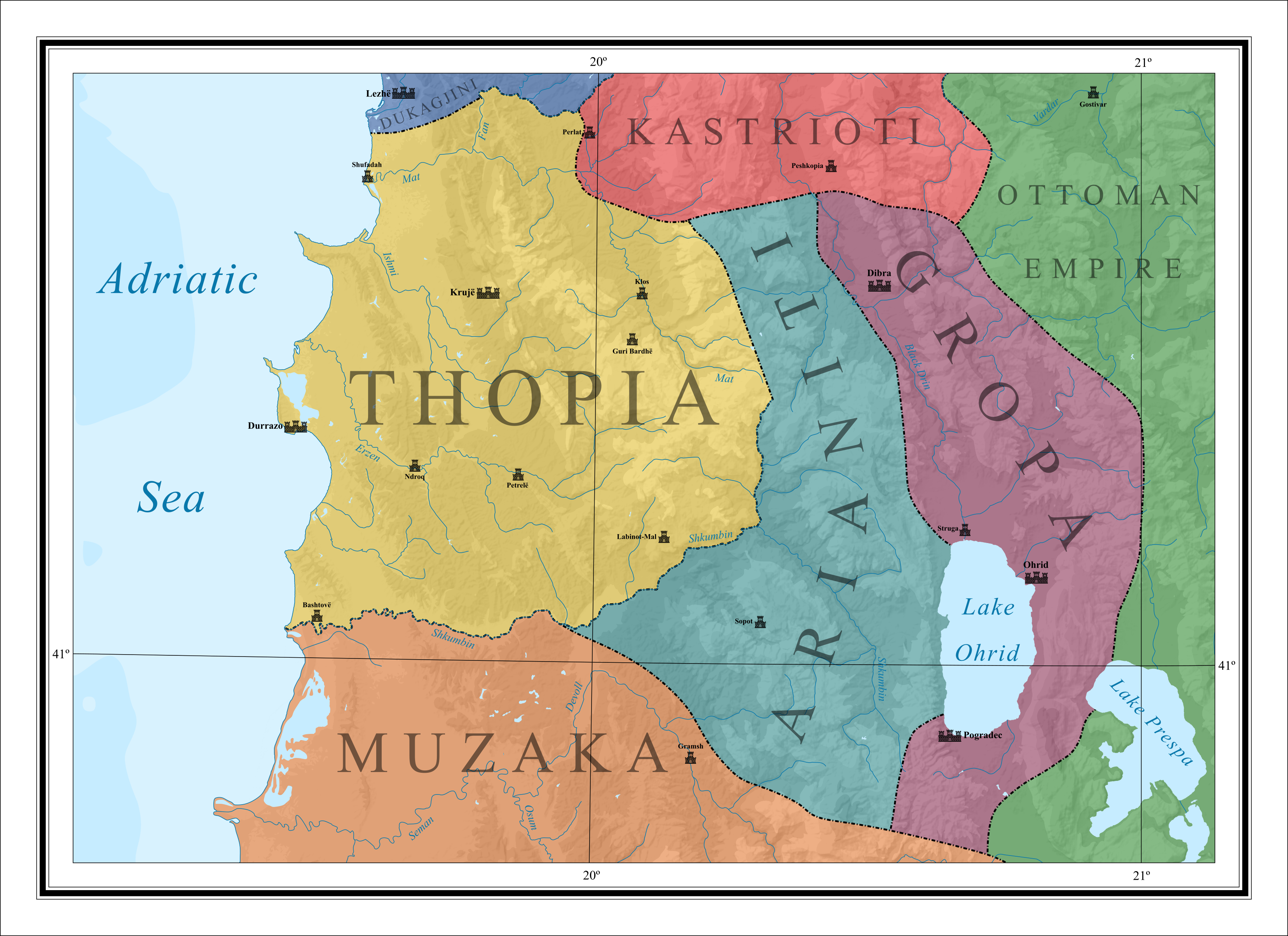
The Principality of Albania, ruled by the Thopias (between 1385 and 1392)

Gjergj, born around the 1370s, was the son of Karl Thopia and Voisava Balsha. A member of the powerful Thopia family, Karl ruled the Principality of Albania on the coast of the Adriatic Sea and played a significant role in regional politics. Voisava came from the influential Balsha family (often the Thopias' rivals) who ruled Zeta, also on the Adriatic coast. Not much is known about Gjergj's early life. He succeeded his father as Prince of Albania after his death in January 1388, though Gjergj was reportedly in poor health at the time. Gjergj held the title Princeps Albaniae (Prince of Albania) and Lord of Durrës. He married the Serbian noblewoman Teodora Branković, daughter of Branko Mladenović of the Branković family. Historical records indicate that Gjergj Thopia and Teodora were in possession of a richly adorned crown.

In April 1391, hostilities between the Thopia and the Balsha flared up once again. The rivalry was partly driven by power struggles in Italy and Western Europe, where King Ladislaus of Naples was competing against the French claimant, Louis II of Anjou, for the Kingdom of Naples. Descended from the Neapolitan royal house through his grandmother, Hélène of Anjou, Gjergj took pride in his Anjou lineage. He aligned himself with Louis who was backed by Clement VII, the first pope seating in Avignon during the Western Schism. In response, the Roman pope, Boniface IX, rejected Gjergj's claim to Durrës, and acknowledged his first cousin Gjergj II Balsha as the city's rightful ruler. This decision had little real effects, as Gjergj Thopia retained control of the city.

At the end of 1391, Gjergj Thopia appointed Philip Barelli as his first chamberlain.

== Venetian relations and the Ottoman threat ==
The Battle of Kosovo in 1389 was a pivotal conflict between the Ottoman Empire, led by Sultan Murad I, and a coalition led by Lazar of Serbia. The Ottoman victory solidified their dominance in the region, prompting local rulers to reassess their strategies. Threatened by the Ottomans' expansion, Gjergj Thopia closely aligned himself with Venice. Although Venice provided military support, it also began preparations for Gjergj's eventual death, given his declining health. The Republic established a faction in Durrës to bolster its position, and by the spring of 1391, it had stationed a strong garrison in the city.

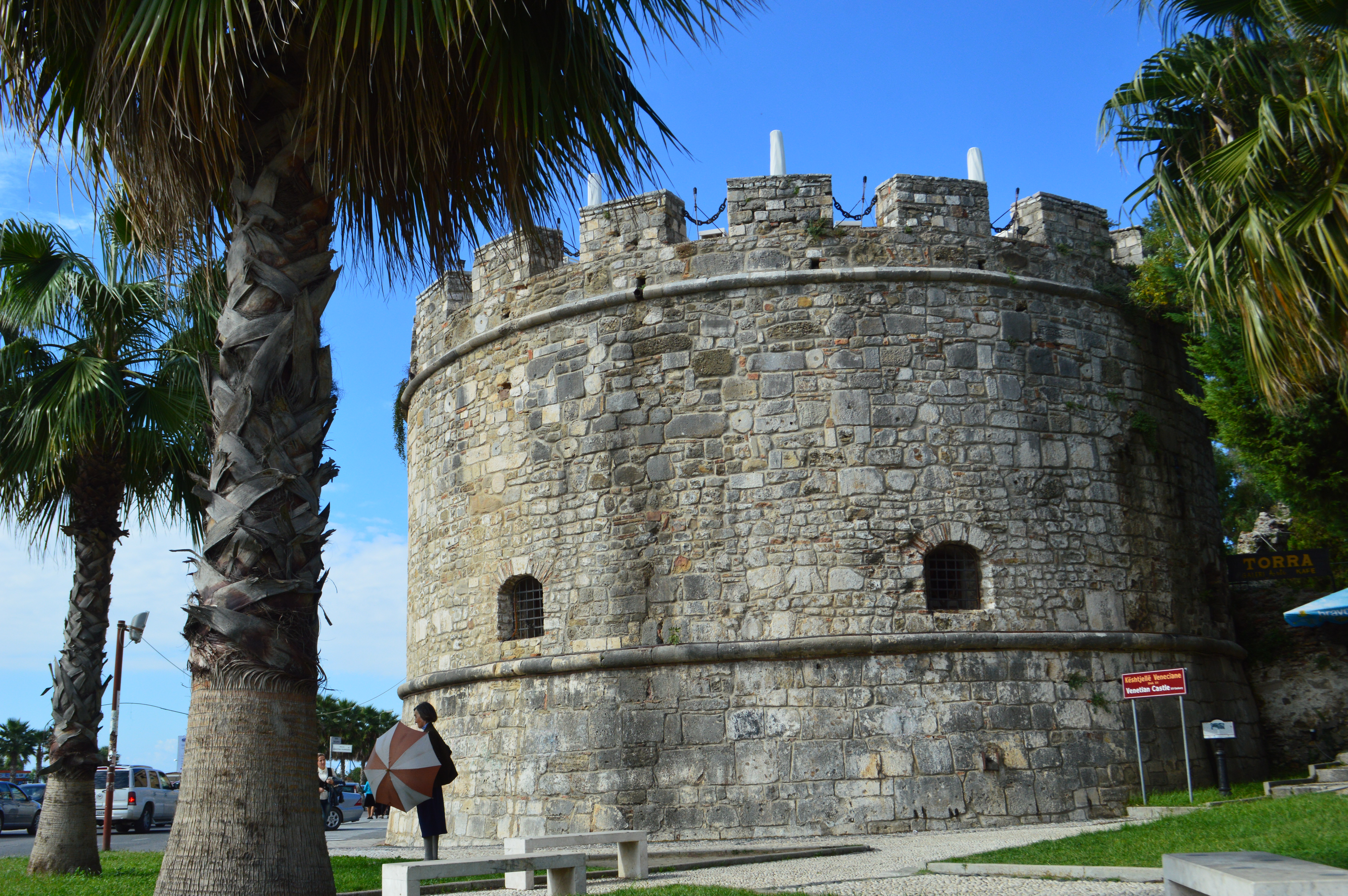
Durrës Castle

Once Ottoman forces began conquering areas previously held by local lords, the Venetian Senate reassessed Albania's strategic importance. The Council's actions in early 1392 were primarily motivated by the looming threat of Ottoman expansion, rather than any ambitions for territorial acquisition by Venice. This decision reflected concerns over merchant safety and the potential for profit from Albanian lands. Venice's entry into Albanian cities, including Durrës, was carefully planned.

A significant moment in Venice's involvement was highlighted by a Council speech on March 8, 1392, discussing the critical need to secure Durrës against the Ottoman threat. The speakers emphasized the considerable investments Venice had made in protecting the city and warned of the severe consequences if Durrës fell into Ottoman hands. The speech sought to justify Venice's moral responsibility to protect Christians and prevent the city's fall. A detailed plan was proposed, instructing Captain Saraceno Dandolo to meet with Gjergj Thopia, assure him of Venice's support, and secure Durrës castle with Venetian expenses.

The Venetian Council, emphasizing its "sincere affection and love" for Gjergj Thopia and the city of Durrës, reassured him of their efforts to protect the city from falling into Ottoman hands. Urging Gjergj to allow Durrës castle to be secured by Venetian forces for the safety of Christianity and the city. At the same time, they assured him that he would retain his rule, governance, and status as lord of Durrës.

In 1392, during a Venetian Council meeting, the council addressed the growing threat to Gjergj Thopia's rule in Durrës from both the Ottomans and the Balsha. A detailed entry from this council session highlighted Venice's authoritative involvement in managing the situation, marking a significant shift in Thopia's status. Despite internal disagreements within the council, the decision was made to appoint the Venetian castellan Paolo da Canal to manage the fortress.

== Requests and final years ==
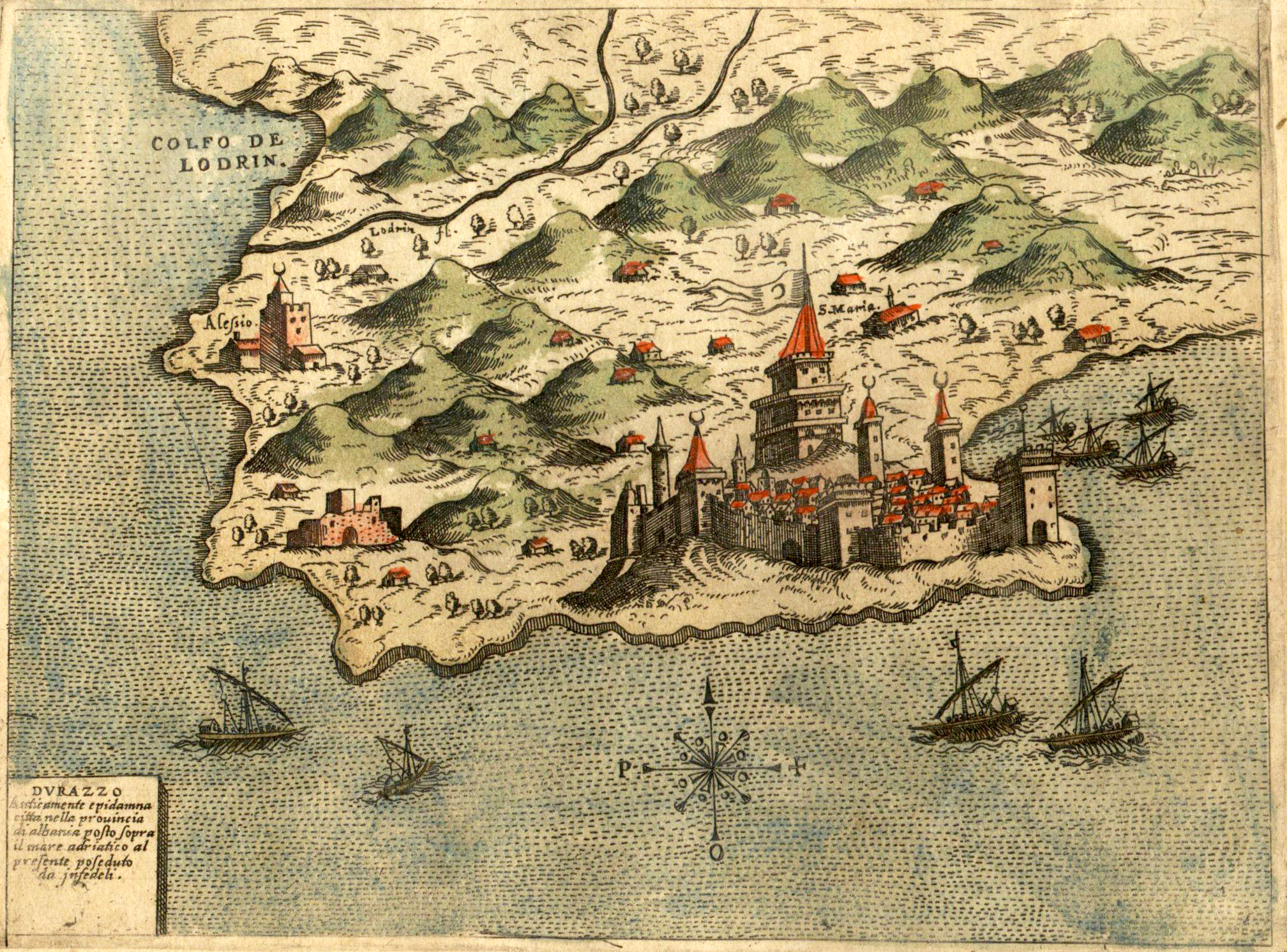
Map of Durrës Castle in 1573

In August 1392, the Venetian Council received Gjergj Thopia's ambassadors following Venice's takeover of Durrës. The ambassadors sought confirmation of existing agreements with Saraceno Dandolo, assistance for Gjergj in reclaiming specific lands and castles, modifications to the currency, a financial loan, and guarantees for the safe return of Albanians who had either fled Ottoman rule or traveled between Venetian and Ottoman territories. The Council's response was positive, repeating Thopia's requests with reassurances that future Venetian Captains would follow suit, reflecting Gjergj Thopia's requests for assistance, which included potential changes to the currency and a financial loan. This agreement was expedited by Thopia's serious illness, which was noted by the council. Thopia's personal request for a gift of sweets and pastries was handled separately as an additional order to the Venetian captain in the city.

== Relinquishment and death ==
Just before his death, Gjergj relinquished control of Durrës to Dandolo in 1392, under increasing pressure from Venice and due to his declining health and political instability. Dandolo formally took possession of the city and its territory following Gjergj's death, which marked the city's submission to Venetian authority. Gjergj Thopia died on October 26, 1392, leaving no heirs. Following his death, the Venetian Council responded by donating an additional 25 gold ducats to Durrës. His sister, Helena Thopia, gained the bulk of the rest of his holdings, whilst a smaller portion was left to his younger sister, Voisava Thopia.

In August 1393, an ambassador from Durrës arrived in Venice representing the commune. The maritime experts Marco Morosini, Nicolò Mudazzo and Benedetto Cappello presented the ambassador's requests to the Venetian council, which mostly involved local issues. One request sparked disagreement among the experts, especially regarding the impact of Gjergj's past decisions on Durrës. Morosini and Cappello highlighted the problem of Thopia's sale of properties and people to Albanians. The council's instructions to the governor of Durrës, Francesco Zorzi, focused on ensuring the safety and return of Venice's subjects whether from Durrës or Albania while also prioritizing the repopulation of the city. Antonio Contarini, a maritime expert, proposed a plan that ultimately prevailed, allowing for a more inclusive approach to repopulating the city and addressing the effects of Gjergj's past actions.

Progon Dukagjini, who was Gjergj Thopia's brother-in-law through his sister Voisava, presented several petitions on behalf of himself and his wife during his visit to Venice in August 1393. Out of the ten requests, one included the return of precious items once belonging to Gjergj Thopia, which were held by the commune, likely made on behalf of his sister, Voisava.

== Family tree ==
Ancestors of Gjergj Thopia

16. Sevasto Thopia
8. Tanusio Thopia
4. Andrea Thopia
9. Unknown
2. Karl Thopia
40. Charles I of Anjou
20. Charles II of Naples
41. Beatrice of Provence
10. Robert, King of Naples
42. Stephen V of Hungary
21. Mary of Hungary
43. Elizabeth the Cuman
5. Hélène of Anjou
11. Unknown
1. Gjergj Thopia
12. Unknown
6. Balsha I
13. Unknown
3. Voisava Balsha
14. Unknown
7. Unknown
15. Unknown

== See also ==
- Thopia family
- Principality of Albania (medieval)
- Saint Gjon Vladimir's Church

== Bibliography ==
- Elsie, Robert (2003). Early Albania A Reader of Historical Texts, 11th-17th Centuries. Harrassowitz. ISBN 978-3-4470-4783-8.
- Fine, John V. A. (1994). The Late Medieval Balkans: A Critical Survey from the Late Twelfth Century to the Ottoman Conquest. University of Michigan Press. ISBN 978-0-4720-8260-5.
- Gjergji, Andromaqi (2004). Albanian Costumes Through the Centuries Origin, Types, Evolution. Acad. of Sciences of Albania, Inst. of Folc Culture. ISBN 978-9-9943-6144-1.
- Hopf, Karl (1873). Chroniques greco-romanes inedites ou peu connues [Unpublished or little-known Greco-Roman chronicles] (in French). Weidmann.
- Jacques, Edwin E. (2009). The Albanians: An Ethnic History from Prehistoric Times to the Present - Volume 1. McFarland & Company. ISBN 978-0-8995-0932-7.
- Lamprecht, Karl (1877). Allgemeine Staatengeschichte vom lateinischen Kreuzzuge bis zur Vollendung der osmanischen Eroberung : 1204 - 1470 [General state history from the Latin Crusades to the completion of the Ottoman conquest: 1204 - 1470] (in German). Perthes.
- Molina, Grabiela Rojas (2022). Decoding Debate in the Venetian Senate Short Stories of Crisis and Response on Albania (1392-1402). Brill. ISBN 978-9-0045-2093-6.
- O'Connell, Monique (2009). Men of Empire Power and Negotiation in Venice's Maritime State. Johns Hopkins University Press. ISBN 978-0-8018-9145-8.
- Qerimi, Muhamet (2017). Venice Efforts to Conquer Durres in the Medieval Age (PDF).
- Sainty, Guy Stair (2018). The Constantinian Order of Saint George and the Angeli, Farnese and Bourbon families which governed it. Boletín Oficial del Estado. ISBN 978-8-4340-2506-6.
- Schmitt, Oliver Jens; Fischer, Bernd J. (2022). A Concise History of Albania. Cambridge University Press. ISBN 978-1-1076-6218-6.
- Soulis, George Christos (1984). The Serbs and Byzantium During the Reign of Tsar Stephen Dušan (1331-1355) and His Successors. Dumbarton Oaks Library and Collection. ISBN 978-0-8840-2137-7.
- Šufflay, Milan (2012). Serbs and Albanians Their Symbiosis in the Middle Ages. GPX Alerion LLC. ISBN 978-0-9887-1292-8.
- Veselinović, Andrija; Ljušić, Radoš (2002). Rodoslovi srpskih dinastija [Genealogies of Serbian dynasties] (in Serbian). Platoneum. ISBN 978-8-6836-3902-1.

Preceded by Karl Thopia as Prince of Albania	Prince of Albania; 1388–92	Succeeded by Helena Thopia as Lady of Krujë
