= Radonić (surname) =

- Language: Serbo-Croatian

Origin
- Origin: derived from given name Radonja

Other names
- Alternative spelling: Serbian Cyrillic: Радонић
- Cognate: Radonjić
- Anglicisation: Radonich

Radonić (Serbian Cyrillic: Радонић) is a Serbo-Croatian surname.

Notable people with the surname include:

- Ante Radonić (born 1951), Croatian astronomer
- Bonaventura Radonić (1888–1945), Croatian cleric and scholar
- Ilarion Radonić (1871–1932), Serbian Orthodox bishop
- Jovan Radonić (1873–1956), Serb historian and academic
- Lovro Radonić (1928–1990), Croatian sportsman
- Luka Radonić (born 1993), Croatian rower
- Ljiljana Radonić (born 1981), Croatian political scientist
- Miljko Radonić (1770–1836), Serb writer and professor
- Novak Radonić (1826–1890), Austrian Serb painter
