= Staniša Radonjić =

- Born: Staniša Radonjić; Njeguši, Sanjak of Herzegovina (now Montenegro)
- Occupations: priest, clan chief, military commander,
- Years active: fl. 1682, 1693
- Employers: Visarion Borilović, Metropolitan of Cetinje 1674–1692; Sava Očinić, Metropolitan of Cetinje 1692–1697
- Title: knez; vojvoda; serdar

Staniša Radonjić (Serbian Cyrillic: Станиша Радоњић), known as Staniša Popov (Станиша Попов; fl. 1682 - 1693), was a Serbian Orthodox priest, chieftain (vojvoda) of the Njeguši tribe, and Serdar of the Prince-Bishopric of Montenegro.

== Life ==
Staniša was born the son of a priest (hence popov), of the Radonjić-Rajićević brotherhood. He is believed to have been first mentioned in the mid-17th century as living in Njeguši. He was a priest, and the chieftain (vojvoda) of the Njeguši tribe. In 1682, he gave the mitre (a ceremonial head-dress for bishops), which he had paid for to be done, to the treasury of Cetinje as a gift to Serbian Orthodox Metropolitan Visarion Borilović (s. 1674–1692). In 1687, Staniša gained notability in trade relations with Kotor, which at the time was part of the Republic of Venice. That year Staniša and Ivan Maričević obliged to the Kotoran court that they would purchase fine wool within ten days from the receival of 435 reals from captain Bernardo Paulucci. On 8 September 1693, he is mentioned (as Stanissa Popov del Comune di Gnegussi) in the agreement between the Katun tribes and the Venetian government (the Dalmatian provveditore) in Kotor. In 1700, Staniša became creditor to the Venetian Republic.

In 1697, Danilo Šćepčević of the Petrović-Heraković brotherhood of Njeguši was appointed Metropolitan of Cetinje. This marked the beginning of what is known in modern historiography as the Prince-Bishopric of Montenegro under the hereditary Metropolitans of Cetinje of the Petrović family. It is believed that Metropolitan Danilo adopted the title of serdar in his government in 1718 when he appointed "guvernaduri and some serdari and knezovi ... to judge and discipline the people". Of this appointed serdar, Staniša is the only one known in historiography. In the beginning, Staniša was only the serdar of a nahija, however, thanks to the prominence of his family and relations to the Venetians, he seized the title as the title of serdar of all of Montenegro. His seal, found in Venetian archives, reads "Staniša, the priest's son, serdar of Montenegro" (»staniša popov srdar černie gori«). As Staniša became serdar and the title became hereditary to the Radonjić brotherhood, the Njeguši tribe was led by the serdar instead of the earlier vojvoda. Later, the significance of the "serdar of all Montenegro" fell, and it remained as a traditional function of a manager, now under the name of guvernadur.

He died in ca. 1720. He had three sons: Vukoslav (Vukosav), Jovan (Jovo) and Marko. After him, his son Vuk, his grandson Stano and his great-grandson Vukolaj III held the position of guvernadur until 1832.

== Legacy ==
On the right central icon of Jesus Christ with the apostles in the church of Holy Mary (sv. Gospođa) on Njeguši, the work of Maksim Tujković from 1720, it mentions the children of Staniša: Vukosav, Jovo and Marko. In that same church, Staniša is mentioned in an inscription by Rafailo Dimitrijević from 1756.

In the folk song about the events from the historical period encompassing his tenure as Serdar c. 1719, the words Stanišić Tower and Stanišić Vuk are mentioned.

== Family ==
He had three sons:

- Vuk (or Vukosav/Vukajlo/Vukale/Vukolaj I), priest and serdar of all Montenegro
  - Stanislav "Stano" Radonjić (1690–1758), vojvoda, serdar, first guvernadur (1756–1758)
    - Vukajlo/Vukale (or Vukolaj II), guvernadur (1758–1764)
    - Jovan (Joko), guvernadur (1764–1802)
      - Vukolaj III, guvernadur (1804–1832)
- Jovo Popov
- Marko
