= Radonjić =

Radonjić may refer to:

- Radonjić (surname)
- Radonjić, Gjakova, a village in the municipality of Gjakova, Kosovo
- Radonjić Lake, Kosovo

== See also ==
- Radonjići, a village in the municipality of Pale, Bosnia and Herzegovina
- Radonić (disambiguation)
