= Sofronije Jugović-Marković =

Serbian writer and activist

Sofronije Jugović-Marković (fl. 1789) was a Habsburg Serb writer and activist in Russian service, who envisaged the formation of a Serbian protectorate of Russia (similar to Georgia), that would have held all South Slavic territories of the Habsburg stretching to Istria. Jugović sought to crown Grand Duke Konstantin Pavlovich "Serbian and Bulgarian Tsar Konstantin Nemanjić", after the medieval Nemanjić dynasty. It would continue the legacy of the Serbian Empire.

== Life ==
He was born in what is today Vojvodina, northern Serbia. In 1785, he was one of the inspectors in the controversial murder of metropolitan Petar Petrović. In 1789 Ivan Radonjić, the governor of Montenegro, wrote for the second time to the Russian Empress Catherine II: "Now, all of us Serbs from Montenegro, Herzegovina, Banjani, Drobnjaci, Kuči, Piperi, Bjelopavlići, Zeta, Klimenti, Vasojevići, Bratonožići, Peć, Kosovo, Prizren, Albania, Macedonia belong to your Excellency and pray that you, as our kind mother, send over Prince Sofronije Jugović." In 1792, he published the work "Serbian Empire and State".

== See also ==
- Petar I Petrović-Njegoš
- Šćepan Mali
- Karađorđe Petrović
- Stevan Šupljikac
