= Branković dynasty =

Serbian noble dynasty

Branković Бранковић
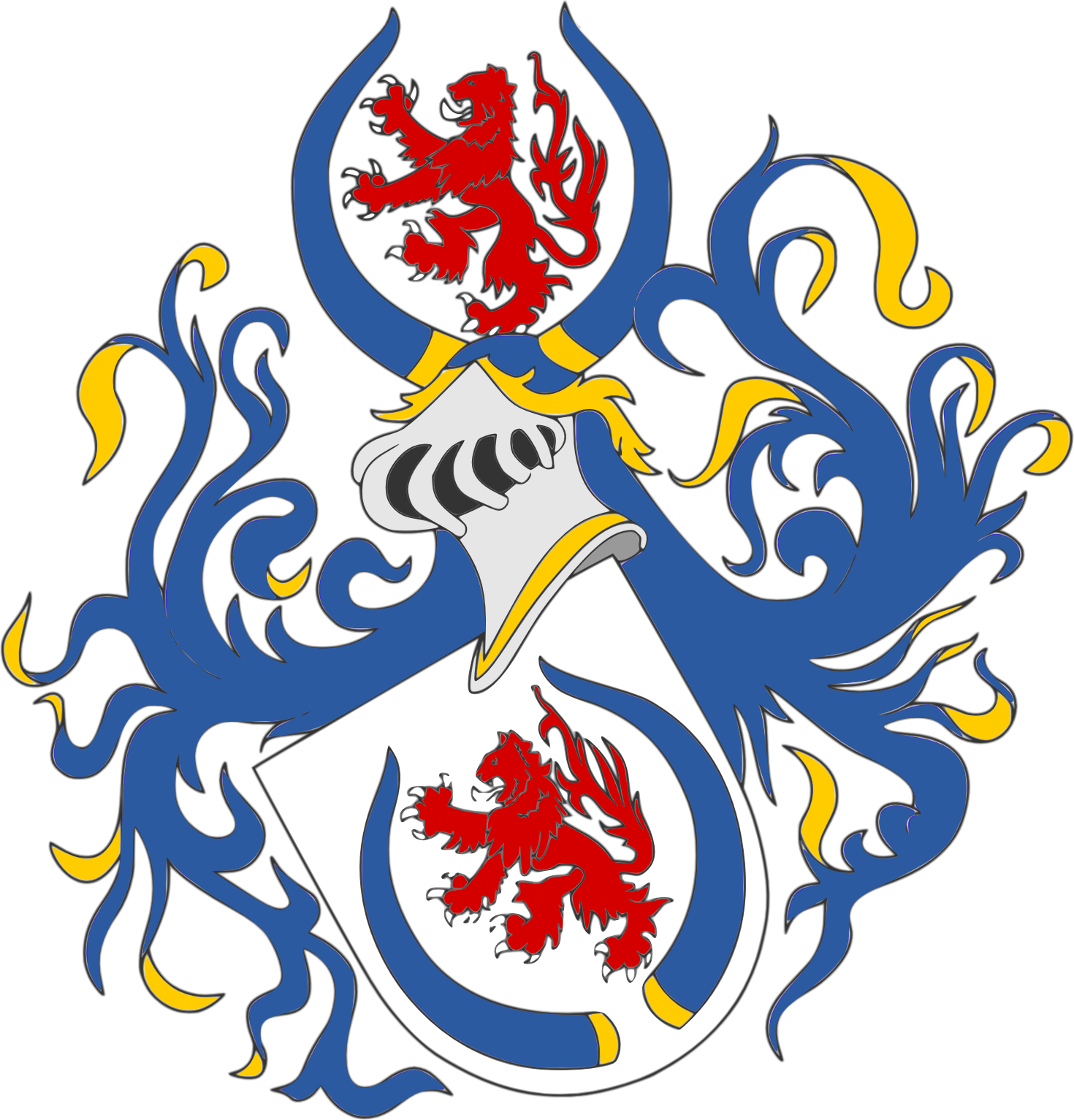
- Parent house: Mladenović (paternal ancestor); Nemanjić dynasty (maternally)
- Country: Serbian Empire; District of Branković; Serbian Despotate; Kingdom of Hungary
- Founded: Second half of 13th century
- Founder: count Mladen (noble family); Vuk Branković (royal family)
- Final ruler: Jovan Branković
- Titles: Despot of Serbia (1427–1502; royal); Grand Prince of Rascia; Prince of Zeta and the Zetan Maritime; Lord of the Serbs and Pomorije and Podunavije; Prince Branković (after 1502)
- Styles: "Majesty" "Royal Highness" "Serene Highness"
- Deposition: 1502

The House of Branković (Serbian Cyrillic: Бранковић, pl. Brankovići / Бранковићи, pronounced [brǎːnkɔv̞itɕ]) is a Serbian medieval noble family and royal dynasty.

== History ==
According to genealogies created in the first half of the 15th century, the family descends via female lineage, through marriage with the Nemanjić dynasty. The family rose to prominence during the fall of the Serbian Empire.

The original family domains were centered in the Kosovo region. Later family members extended their rule over all remaining unconquered regions of Serbia making them the last sovereign rulers of medieval Serbia. The dynasty ruled the Serbian Despotate from 1427 to 1459 and their descendants continue to claim the throne of the Despotate Serbia, some having entered the ranks of the Hungarian aristocracy, while other descendants of the dynasty continue to go by a courtesy title.

Members of the family intermarried with other noble houses from neighbouring countries including Austrian and Hungarian nobility, and provided at least one wife to the Ottoman Sultan. By the 17th century, Branković lineage had become part of the House of Habsburg, providing more descendants into the ruling houses of Europe.

One such descendant was Maria of Yugoslavia, the wife of Alexander I of Yugoslavia. With the ascension of her son Peter II of Yugoslavia in 1934, Branković, Lazarević, and Nemanjić blood returned to the Serbian throne.

== Notable members ==
- Vuk Branković, lord of District of Branković (1371–1396)
- Đurađ Branković, lord of District of Branković (1396–1412), Despot of Serbia (1427–1456)
- Lazar Branković, Despot of Serbia (1456–1458)
- Stefan Branković, Despot of Serbia (1458–1459)
- Angelina of Serbia, titular Despotess of Serbia (1460–1476)
- Jelena Branković, the last Queen of Bosnia (1461–1463)
- Mara Brankovic, daughter of Despot Đurađ, wife of Ottoman sultan Murad II (1435–1451) and stepmother of sultan Mehmed II
- Vuk Grgurević Branković, titular Despot of Serbia (1471–1485)
- Đorđe Branković, titular Despot of Serbia (1486–1497)
- Jovan Branković, titular Despot of Serbia (1493–1502)

== Family tree ==
=== Predecessors ===
- Unknown
  - Nikola, Serb župan in modern-day Northern Albania
  - Vojvoda Mladen, ruled Trebinje and Dračevica
    - Ratislava, daughter of Vojvoda Mladen, married Altoman Vojinović

=== Brankovići ===
- Branko Mladenović, son of Vojvoda Mladen, ruled Ohrid
  - Nikola Radonja, the eldest son of Branko Mladenović who governed an estate in Serres region, married Jelena Mrnjavčević and later became a monk on Hilandar
  - Vuk Branković, Prince of Raška and Kosovo, married Marija Lazarević
    - Đurađ Branković, Prince and Despot of Serbia (1427–1456)
      - Todor (died young)
      - Grgur Branković, married Jelisaveta N
        - (illegitimate) Vuk Grgurević, titular Despot of Serbia, married Barbara Frankopan
      - Stefan Branković, Despot of Serbia (20 June 1458 - 8 April 1459), exiled from Serbia 1459, a saint of the Serbian Orthodox Church, married Angelina Arianiti
        - Đorđe Branković, titular Despot of Serbia, later took monastic vows under the name Maksim, and became Metropolitan of Belgrade and Srem, died in 1516.
          - (uncertain) Jelisaveta, married Alessio Spani, Lord of Drivasto and Polog
        - Jovan Branković, Despot of Serbia, married Jelena Jakšić
          - Marija, married Ferdinand Frankopan, of the House of Frankopan
          - Jelena, married Peter IV Rareş, Prince of Moldavia
          - Ana, married Fiodor Sanguszko, Marshal of Volhynia
          - Marija Magdalena, married Iwan Wiśniowiecki, a noble from Volhynia
        - Marija, married Bonifacio III, Mongrave of Montferrat
        - (uncertain) Milica Despina, married Neagoe Basarab, prince of Wallachia
      - Lazar Branković, Despot of Serbia (24 December 1456 - 20 June 1458), married Jelena Palaiologina
        - Jelena, married Stjepan Tomašević, King of Bosnia (1461–1463) and Despot of Serbia (1459),
        - Jerina, married Gjon Kastrioti II, son of Skanderbeg
        - Milica, married Leonardo III Tocco, Lord of Epirus
      - Jelena
      - Mara, married Murad II, Sultan of the Ottoman Empire
      - Katarina Branković, married Ulrich II, Count of Celje
    - Grgur
    - Lazar
  - Grgur Branković, Lord of Polog under Vukašin Mrnjavčević
  - Teodora Branković, married George Thopia, Prince of Albania and Lord of Durazzo

== Sources ==
- Andrić, Stanko (2016). "Saint John Capistran and Despot George Branković: An Impossible Compromise". Byzantinoslavica. 74 (1–2): 202–227.
- Bataković, Dušan T., ed. (2005). Histoire du peuple serbe [History of the Serbian People] (in French). Lausanne: L’Age d’Homme.
- Božanić, Snežana (2015). "The Political and Cultural Life of Despot Đorđe Branković in Syrmia". The Cultural and Historical Heritage of Vojvodina in the Context of Classical and Medieval Studies. Novi Sad: Faculty of Philosophy. pp. 191–203.
- Ćirković, Sima (2004). The Serbs. Malden: Blackwell Publishing.
- Fine, John Van Antwerp Jr. (1994) [1987]. The Late Medieval Balkans: A Critical Survey from the Late Twelfth Century to the Ottoman Conquest. Ann Arbor, Michigan: University of Michigan Press.
- Isailović, Neven G.; Krstić, Aleksandar R. (2015). "Serbian Language and Cyrillic Script as a Means of Diplomatic Literacy in South Eastern Europe in 15th and 16th Centuries". Literacy Experiences concerning Medieval and Early Modern Transylvania. Cluj-Napoca: George Bariţiu Institute of History. pp. 185–195.
- Ivanović, Miloš (2016). "Foreigners in the Service of Despot Đurađ Branković on Serbian territory". Banatica. 26 (2): 257–268.
- Ivanović, Miloš (2018). "The Nobility of the Despotate of Serbia between Ottoman Empire and Hungary (1457–1459)". Secular Power and Sacral Authority in Medieval East-Central Europe. Amsterdam: Amsterdam University Press. pp. 167–177.
- Ivić, Pavle, ed. (1995). The History of Serbian Culture. Edgware: Porthill Publishers.
- Jireček, Constantin (1911). Geschichte der Serben. Vol. 1. Gotha: Perthes.
- Jireček, Constantin (1918). Geschichte der Serben. Vol. 2. Gotha: Perthes.
- Krstić, Aleksandar R. (2017). "Which Realm will You Opt for? – The Serbian Nobility Between the Ottomans and the Hungarians in the 15th Century". State and Society in the Balkans Before and After Establishment of Ottoman Rule. Belgrade: Institute of History, Yunus Emre Enstitüsü Turkish Cultural Centre. pp. 129–163.
- Paizi-Apostolopoulou, Machi (2012). "Appealing to the Authority of a Learned Patriarch: New Evidence on Gennadios Scholarios' Responses to the Questions of George Branković". The Historical Review. 9: 95–116.
- Pilat, Liviu (2010). "Mitropolitul Maxim Brancovici, Bogdan al III-lea şi legăturile Moldovei cu Biserica sârbă". Analele Putnei (in Romanian). 6 (1): 229–238.
- Samardžić, Radovan; Duškov, Milan, eds. (1993). Serbs in European Civilization. Belgrade: Nova, Serbian Academy of Sciences and Arts, Institute for Balkan Studies.
- Sedlar, Jean W. (1994). East Central Europe in the Middle Ages, 1000-1500. Seattle: University of Washington Press.
- Spremić, Momčilo (2004). "La famille serbe des Branković - considérations généalogiques et héraldiques" (PDF). Зборник радова Византолошког института (in French). 41: 441–452.
- Spremić, Momčilo (2014). "Le Despote Stefan Lazarević et Sieur Djuradj Branković" (PDF). Balcanica. 45: 145–163.
- Stanković, Vlada, ed. (2016). The Balkans and the Byzantine World before and after the Captures of Constantinople, 1204 and 1453. Lanham, Maryland: Lexington Books.
- Stojkovski, Boris; Ivanić, Ivana; Spăriosu, Laura (2018). "Serbian-Romanian Relations in the Middle Ages until the Ottoman Conquest" (PDF). Transylvanian Review. 27 (2): 217–229. Archived from the original (PDF) on 2022-01-21.
- Wasilewski, Tadeusz (1963). "Przyczynki źródłowe do stosunków Polski ze Słowiańszczyzną południową w wiekach XIII-XVI" (PDF). Studia Źródłoznawcze. 8: 117–124.
- Zabolotnaia, Lilia (2010). "Câteva precizări despre dinastia Branković". Tyragetia. 4 (2): 115–122.
- Zečević, Nada (2014). The Tocco of the Greek Realm: Nobility, Power and Migration in Latin Greece (14th-15th centuries). Belgrade: Makart.
