= Vukale Stanišić =

Guvernadur of Montenegro

- Вукале Станишић

Guvernadur of Montenegro
- In office 1758–1764
- Monarchs: Sava II; Vasilije III
- Preceded by: Stanislav Radonjić
- Succeeded by: Jovan Radonjić

Vukale Stanišić (Serbian Cyrillic: Вукале Станишић, fl. 1761) was possibly the guvernadur of Montenegro in the period between 1758 and 1764.

A judgment from June 3, 1761, written by "Vukale Stanišić" (Писах ја Вукале Станишић по ријечи вишереченијех), points to that Vukale was the guvernadur, as the guvernadur signed first in civil cases. The surname also supports this, Stanišić being a patronymic pointing to Staniša (Stanislav) – the previous guvernadur Stanislav Radonjić.

Preceded by Stanislav Radonjić	Guvernadur fl. 1761	Succeeded by Jovan Radonjić
