= Lazar Vuković =

- Born: after 1377
- Died: 11–12 July 1410
Names
- Lazar Vuković Branković
- Dynasty: Branković
- Father: Vuk Branković
- Mother: Mara Lazarević
- Religion: Orthodoxy

Lazar Vuković Branković (Serbian Cyrillic: Лазар Вуковић Бранковић; died 12 July 1410), was a Serbian prince (knez), the son of Lord Vuk Branković (r. 1378–1389) and Mara Lazarević. During the Ottoman Interregnum, the Vuković (Branković) betrayed Musa Çelebi, who was defeated in June 1410. Stefan Lazarević, who continued supporting Musa, retreated after the battle to Constantinople, while his cousin Vuk and Lazar Vuković headed back home. They were intercepted by Musa's people and both were murdered on 11 July 1410. Old Serbian chronicles erroneously documented that Đurađ Grgurević, Lazar Vuković, Vuk and Lazar Lazarević were killed in 1410.
