= District of Branković =

Medieval Serbian state

District of Branković Земља Бранковића Zemlja Brankovića
- 1371–1412
- Flag Coat of arms

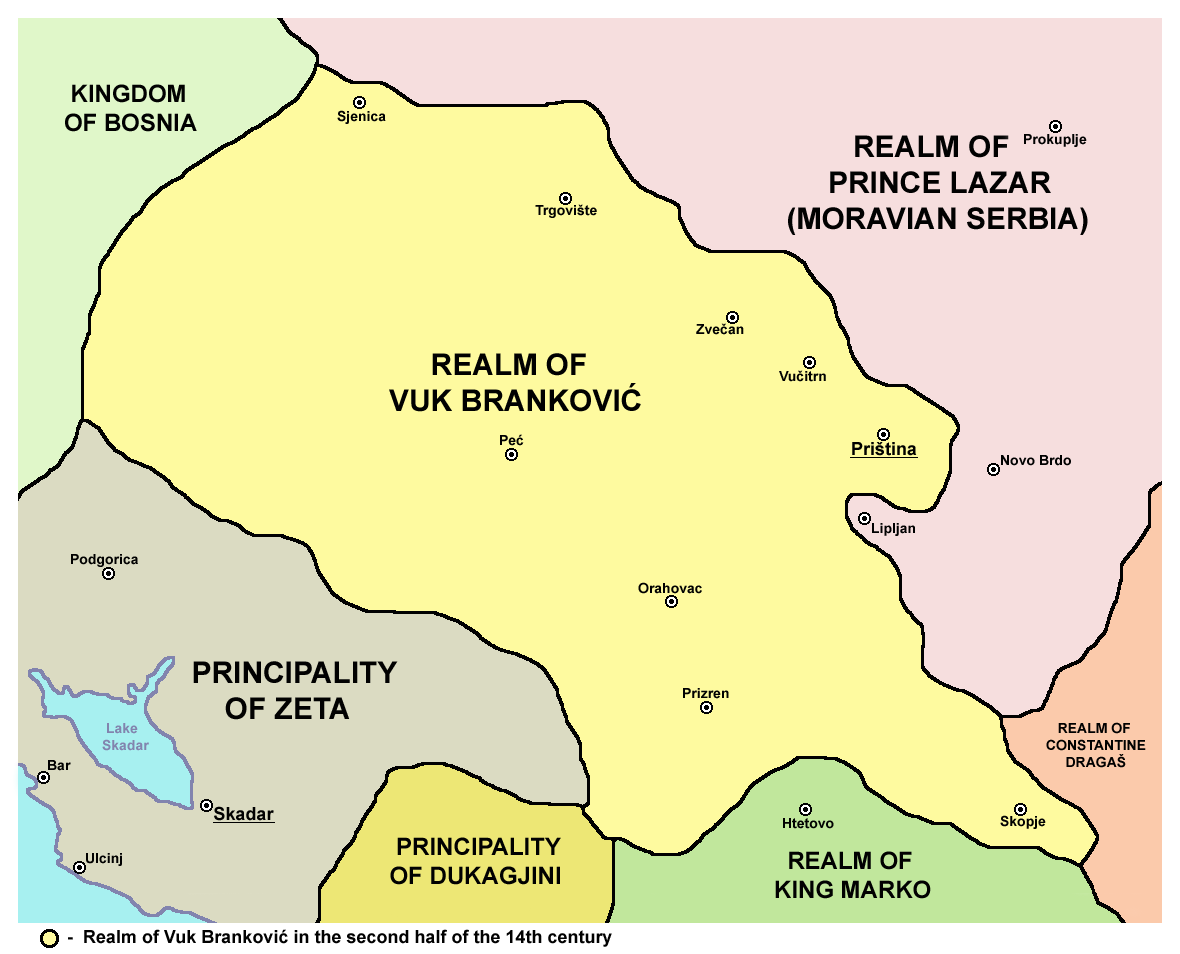
- Realm of Brankovic from 1373 to 1395
- Capital: Priština
- Common languages: Serbian
- Religion: Serbian Orthodox Church
- Government: Monarchy
- Lord (Gospodin)
  - 1371–1396: Vuk Branković
  - 1396–1412: Đurađ Branković
- History
  - Dissolution of the Serbian Empire: 1371
  - Peace between Stefan Lazarević and Đurađ: 1412
- Currency: Serbian perper
Preceded by	Succeeded by
Serbian Empire	Serbian Despotate

The District of Branković (Serbian: Земља Бранковића / Zemlja Brankovića) or Vuk's Land (Serbian: Вукова земља / Vukova zemlja) was one of the medieval Serbian states that emerged from the collapse of the Serbian Empire in 1371. The founder of this realm was Vuk Branković, who would participate at the Battle of Kosovo in 1389. After the battle, Branković would become one of the most powerful Serbian regional rulers.

The District of Branković centred around present-day Kosovo, with cities such as Pristina being particularly important.

== History ==
Vuk Branković was the son of Branko of Ohrid, who governed lands in Macedonia under Stefan Dušan (1331–1346). After the Battle of Maritsa, the Serb nobility had been weakened. This led to Branković rapidly expanding his authority over much of present-day Kosovo and Macedonia.

The Realm of Branković was located in the largest part of present-day Kosovo and parts of Southern Serbia. Vuk also governed eastern parts of the Raška region (including the old Serbian capital Ras) and lands in Polimlje, in present-day northern Montenegro, as well as Skoplje for a short time. After the death of Đurađ I Balšić of Zeta in 1373, Vuk captured cities of Prizren and Peć and the area of Metohija. The most important cities in Vuk's Realm were Priština, Prizren, Skopje, Peć and Ras, as well as the rich mining settlements of Novo Brdo, Trepča, Janjevo, Gluhavica and others.

The semi-independent lordship ceased to exist as such with the establishment of Serbian Despotate by Stefan Lazarević. Still, the Branković wielded a significant amount of power in the state, controlling most of Serbia's extremely rich ore extraction sites. Đurađ Branković inherited the title of Serbian despot as Stefan died childless.

== Rulers ==
- Vuk Branković (1371–1396, founder)
- Đurađ Branković (1396–1412)
