= Stanislav Radonjić =

Guvernadur of Montenegro

Stanislav Popov Radonjić
- Станислав Радоњић

Guvernadur of Montenegro
- In office 1756 – 17 March 1758
- Monarchs: Sava II; Vasilije III
- Preceded by: Office established
- Succeeded by: Vukale Stanišić

Personal details
- Born: 1690 Njeguši, Prince-Bishopric of Montenegro
- Died: 17 March 1758 (aged 67–68) Saint Petersburg, Russian Empire

Stanislav Popov Radonjić (Serbian Cyrillic: Станислав Радоњић) or Staniša Stanišić (Станиша Станишић); 1690 – 17 March 1758), known as Stano (Стано), was a vojvoda, serdar and the first guvernadur (governor) of the Prince-Bishopric of Montenegro from 1756 until he died in 1758, serving Metropolitan Sava II Petrović-Njegoš.

== Life ==
He was born in Njeguši, Old Montenegro. His father was the priest and serdar Vukolaj, while his grandfather and namesake was serdar Staniša Radonjić "Stano". He was elected by the Montenegrin zbor in Cetinje following the victory against the Ottomans at Bijele Poljane, where he killed their commander, Ahmet-paša. The diploma that confirmed his title as gubernadur appears: "Did wonders in the battlefield – Bijele poljane".

He died in St. Petersburg and was buried with great honor by the Russian court in a tomb bearing the family coat of arms. After his death, his eldest son Vukajlo Radonjić (1758–1764) succeeded him as guvernadur, succeeded in turn by his younger brother Jovan Radonjić (1764–1802) and Jovan's son Vukolaj Radonjić (1804–1832).

== Diplomacy with Russia ==
During his stay as Metropolitan Vasilija's escort in Moscow and St. Petersburg, Radonjic received an allowance of 100 rubles per month from the Russian government, while the other heads of the Metropolitan escort received only 50. This implies that the Russian government considered him more important than the others.

As the mandator of the Montenegrin people, Bishop Vasilije traveled to Russia in June 1752. Accompanying him to Vienna was serdar Stanislav Radonjic. He received a courtesy audience with Empress Maria Theresa. Seen off with gifts and medals, Stano visited Pope Benedict XIV (1740–1758), seeking assistance in an amount of 50,000 SCA for reconstruction and maintenance of monasteries on the territory from Kotor to Venetian Albania, which was then under the religious authority of Cetinje mitropholy.

== Annotations ==
- Name: Stanislav Vukolajev Radonjić

First	Guvernadur; 1756 – 1758	Succeeded by Vukale Stanišić
