= Vukolaj Radonjić =

Monarch of Montenegro

Kavalijer Vukolaj Radonjić Вуколај Радоњић
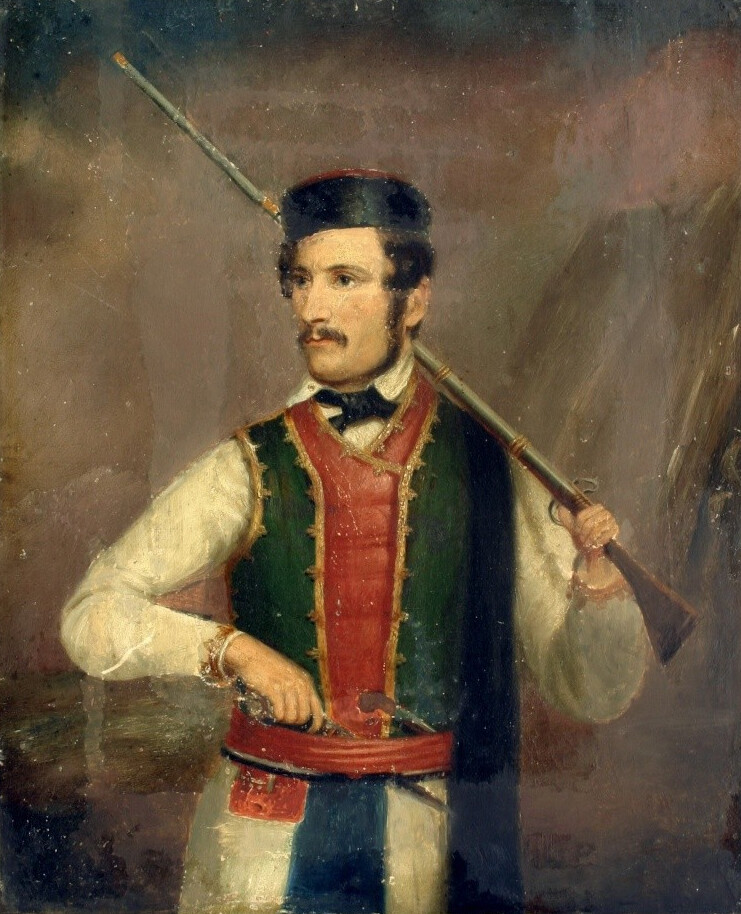
- "The Last Montenegrin Guvernadur Vukolaj Radonjić" (painting by Adam Stefanović)

Guvernadur of Montenegro
- In office 8 July 1803 – 16 January 1832
- Monarchs: Petar I Petar II
- Preceded by: Jovan Radonjić
- Succeeded by: Office abolished

Personal details
- Born: 1765 Njeguši, Prince-Bishopric of Montenegro
- Died: 29 May 1832 (aged 66–67) Cattaro, Austrian Empire
- Awards: Order of Saint Anna; Order of St. George

Vukolaj Radonjić (Serbian Cyrillic: Вуколај Радоњић, 1765 – 29 May 1832) was the last Montenegrin guvernadur.

== Biography ==
His training was completed in the noble Academy in Shklow (Belarus) in 1778, where he gained the title of kavalijer (Knight), and received the Order of Saint Anna. He married Stana Vukova Petrovic (Njeguši), about 1775. Still at the time of his father's, Jovan Radonjić term Vukolaj Radonjić served as acting guvernadur between 1798 and 1799, and as guvernadur was a member of the Montenegrin National Assembly, just like his paternal parallel cousin, clergyman, Stanko Radonjić. He was a nahija (district) judge from 1799 and was formally elected guvernadur on 15 May 1804, by the People Assembly, two years after the death of his father. On 29 October 1813 Vukolaj Radonjić along with Petar I Petrović-Njegoš and leaders of other districts signed the Agreement on the Declaration of union between Montenegro and Boka in Dobrota in the name of the whole of Montenegro and the Highlands (Brda). Vukolaj commanded a group of 3,000 soldiers in the Battle at the Fortress of Trinity (Kotor), which expelled Napoleon's soldiers.

He and his brother, Marko Radonjic, were charged with a variety of offenses, and Bishop Peter II Njegoš had returned General Montenegrin seal (which belonged to his grandfather the first Montenegrin guvernadur Stanislav Radonjic, and then his father guvernadur Jovan Radonjic). On 16 January 1832, they were brought to court and convicted to chains and imprisonment in the cave of the monastery in Cetinje. The cave was later called Guvernadurica, because Vukolaj was the first political prisoner in this prison. Later on, until the end of World War II the cave was used as a cell for mostly political prisoners. 32 members of Radonjić family were exiled from their family houses to the Austrian territory Kotor. 6 of them were immediately killed in their homes, because they did not want to leave. Their property was seized and divided, houses burned and levelled to the ground. Bishop Peter II Njegoš also demanded that the authorities of Kotor force that Radonjići sell their property in Boka, but the Kotor authorities refused to comply.

In the prison Vukolaj fell ill and on 20 April 1832 under the escort of gvardija (guard) was taken to Kotor. He died in Kotor hospital in the night from 29 to 30 May 1832 suffering from the effects of bondage during his imprisonment in Guvernadurica.

== The Last Montenegrin Guvernadur ==
A portrait of "The Last Montenegrin Gubernadur Vukolaj Radonjic" - oil on canvas 25 cm x 30 cm, painter Adam Stefanovic - from the private collection of J. Vujic, the National Museum in Belgrade (illustrated above).

== Interests ==
- L. K. Viala De Somier, a French colonel, commander of Herceg Novi, Kotor Governor and Head of General Staff other divisions Illyrian army in Dubrovnik, visited Montenegro 1810.godine and gubernadur Vukolaj Radonjic to Njegusi and as he says: "vernacular residence and center of temporal power in Montenegro," For the first twenty steps from the house to meet me came gubernadur accompanied two priests and the elders of the people under sixty weapons .After first common compliments, gubernadur is my left hand laid on his right shoulder, and his right hand on my left shoulder and said: "I will be very happy you are my friend, because you did not come with bad intentions. now we're sweet with that which you are encouraged to come in our country. All the stars of heaven will be put out before you forget. " Shot from guns, ringing tones, clicking people, caused enthusiasm ... With all the sense: God! Napoleon Soldat!...
- French described guvernadur, with which he met in his home on Njeguši, as a man who "comes from a very old family, which is the honor" because of the extraordinary courage deserves the love of the fatherland. "In guvernadur, imposing man of pleasant appearance, generosity is coupled with the subtlety and the impression of deep sincerity. Expressing his casually, judiciously, but not flamboyantly. Its refinement contradict the harsh simplicity of nature and other people, and the tendency of "kind words" to show "fairness and sophistication of his observations, probably a consequence of the fact that" he traveled far Northern and Eastern Europe. (P.36). Guvernadur was awarded the Russian Order of St. George. And St. Anne of the second row, whose cross "indescribable perfection, decorated with precious, very brilliant stones." (P.34). The "precious gift of a great monarch," notes Somier, "fits nicely" to guvernadur. However, he continues, "is very strange to see dressed in costumes Spain ruler of a people who wear very different clothes."

Guvernadur Vuko Radonjic Otherwise, the lives of personal income, which consist in the possession of land, large flock, and, in part, income from fishing. (P.36-37). In addition, Somier said: "We should not think that this ruler more luxurious lives in the palace, to have a watch and a great house. None of that is that it need people Posted: he manage their fairness and holding that every price. No difference between this simple "Governance and the rule of large emperors. Guvernadur is, according to the French, educated man, who lives modestly and thinner, managed wisely and reputation gains - virtue ("fairness and holding that any price"). Such is its wider family: "Guvernadur's brothers do not have any characteristic that make them stand out from the rest of the world. There are six, are all heroes in the most important event the left to the people fear and respect".

== Annotations ==
His given name is also spelled Vukale (Вукале Радоњић).
