= Momčilo Spremić =

Serbian historian

- Born: Момчило Спремић; August 29, 1937; Donja Badanja, Loznica, Kingdom of Yugoslavia
- Occupation: historian

Momčilo Spremić (Serbian: Момчило Спремић; born August 29, 1937) is a Serbian historian and member of the Serbian Academy of Science and Arts. He is professor of General history of the Middle Ages at the University of Belgrade Faculty of Philosophy. Spremić specialized in the History of the Balkans, Italy and Spain in the Late Middle Ages.

== Life and career ==
Spremić was born in Donja Badanja village near Loznica, in what was then the Kingdom of Yugoslavia. He graduated from the University of Belgrade Faculty of Philosophy in 1961 and received his magister in 1965.

Spremić received his PhD in 1969, from Belgrade University with the thesis Dubrovnik i Aragonci 1442–1495, which was later published in 1971 in Serbian and in 1986 in Italian. He is a member of many professional societies, a member of the board of SIHMED (Société internationale des historiens de la Méditerranée) and a member of the executive board of the European Society of Culture (Société européenne de culture). The issue of Vuk Branković's treachery during the Battle of Kosovo in 1389 was the subject of a series of studies by Spremić. Despite the consensus of modern historiography in Serbia that Vuk Branković was not a traitor during the battle, Spremić emphasized that there is a possibility that Vuk really betrayed his Serbian allies. On November 5, 2009, he was elected a member of the Serbian Academy of Sciences and Arts.

Spremić received numerous awards which include: Svetosavska povelja 2009, Čuvari baštine, Zlatni ključ grada Smedereva (Golden key of city of Smederevo), Nagrada Vukove Zadužbine za nauku (Vuk's Endowment Award for Science) for his work Despot George Branković and his times, Nagrada fonda Dušana Baranina (Award of the Dušan Baranin Foundation), Order of Merit of the Italian Republic (5th Class / Knight), bestowed by the President of the Italian Republic and Oktobarska nagrada Grada Beograda (October Award of the City of Belgrade).

== Selected works ==
Spremić published about two hundred scientific works which include:

- Turski tributari u XIV i XV veku, 1970.
- Dubrovnik i Aragonci 1442–1495, Beograd 1971. (Dubrovnik e gli Aragonesi 1442–1495, Palermo 1986), OCLC Number: 443358657
- Despot Đurađ Branković i mačvanska banovina, Istorijski časopis 23, 1976.
- Dubrovačka trgovačka društva u despotovini Đurđa Brankovića, Zbornik Filozofskog fakulteta u Beogradu
- Gli Slavi tra le due sponde adriatiche, Annali dell Istituto italiano per gli Studi Storici 4, 1979.
- Despot Đurađ Branković i papska Kurija (Despot George Branković and Papal Curia), vol. 16, Zbornik Filozofskog fakulteta, 1989, pp. 163–177, OCLC 438784272
- Treba li rehabilitovati najvećeg izdajnika? Vuk nije bio Branković (Should we rehabilitate the greatest traitor? Vuk wasn't Brankovic), vol. 11, Serbian heritage-Historical notebooks, 1998, archived from the original on July 28, 2011
- Despot Đurađ Branković i njegova doba (Despot George Branković and his times) (2 ed.), Belgrade: Clio, 1999 [1994], OCLC 43055575
- Đurađ Branković: 1427–1456 (in Serbian), Belgrade: Zavod za udžbenike i nastavna sredstva, 2006, ISBN 86-17-13750-9
- Srbija i Venecija (VI-XVI vek), 2014.
