= Donja Badanja =

Donja Badanja Доња Бадања (Serbian)
- Village (Selo)
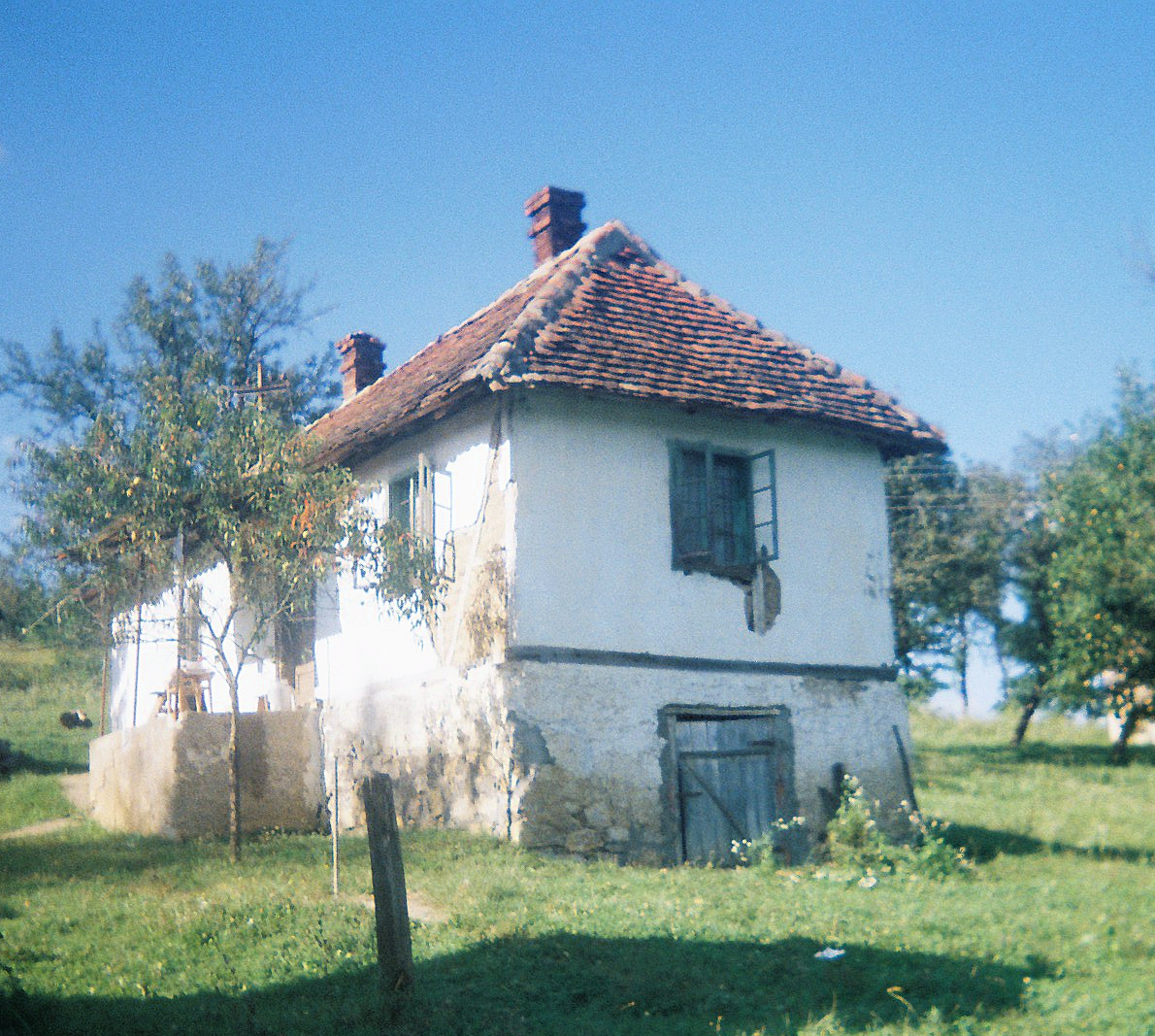
- Old country house in Donja Badanja

- Location within Serbia
- Coordinates: 44°29′20.04″N 19°27′42.84″E
- Country: Serbia
- District: Mačva District
- Subdivision: Loznica municipality
- Elevation: 180 m (590 ft)

Population (2011)
  - Total: 381
- Postal code: 15324
- Area code: 015
- Vehicle registration: LO
- Abbreviation: DB

Donja Badanja (Serbian Cyrillic: Доња Бадања, meaning 'a wooden pipe made of a hollowed trunk', often used to direct water on the wheel of a water-mill) is a village in western Serbia. It is located in the municipality of Loznica, in the Mačva District. Donja Badanja's current population is 510 (2002 census). According to 1991 census population was 670.

== Geography and features ==
Donja Badanja is a village located at the base of the mountain Cer and the low mountain Iverak, in the Jadar region. The Cernica River runs through Donja Badanja. The altitude of Donja Badanja is 180 -m-. Donja Badanja is connected by motorway to Šabac and Loznica, and further by highway to Belgrade. Donja Badanja has a moderate continental climate, with four seasons. Autumn is longer than spring, with long sunny and warm periods. Winter is not so severe, with an average of 22 days of sub-zero temperature. January is the coldest month, with an average temperature of -1.9 °C. Spring is usually short and rainy, while summer arrives abruptly. There is a spa in area of Donja Badanja called Banja Badanja with two springs of mineral water (one is sulphurous and the other contains iron). The sulphur water is more mineralized than the iron water. There is a hostel named Cernica in Banja Badanja and other larger hotel is built at the present.

== History ==
According to legend, the village's name comes from badanj, a wooden pipe which has been used to direct water onto a water-mill wheel. There were many water-mills in Donja Badanja in the past; just a few remain today.

== Demographics ==
Historical population

Year	Pop.	±%
1948	1,187	—
1953	1,152	−2.9%
1961	1,061	−7.9%
1971	879	−17.2%

Year	Pop.	±%
1981	756	−14.0%
1991	670	−11.4%
2002	510	−23.9%
2011	381	−25.3%
