= Branko Mladenović =

Serbian magnate

Branko
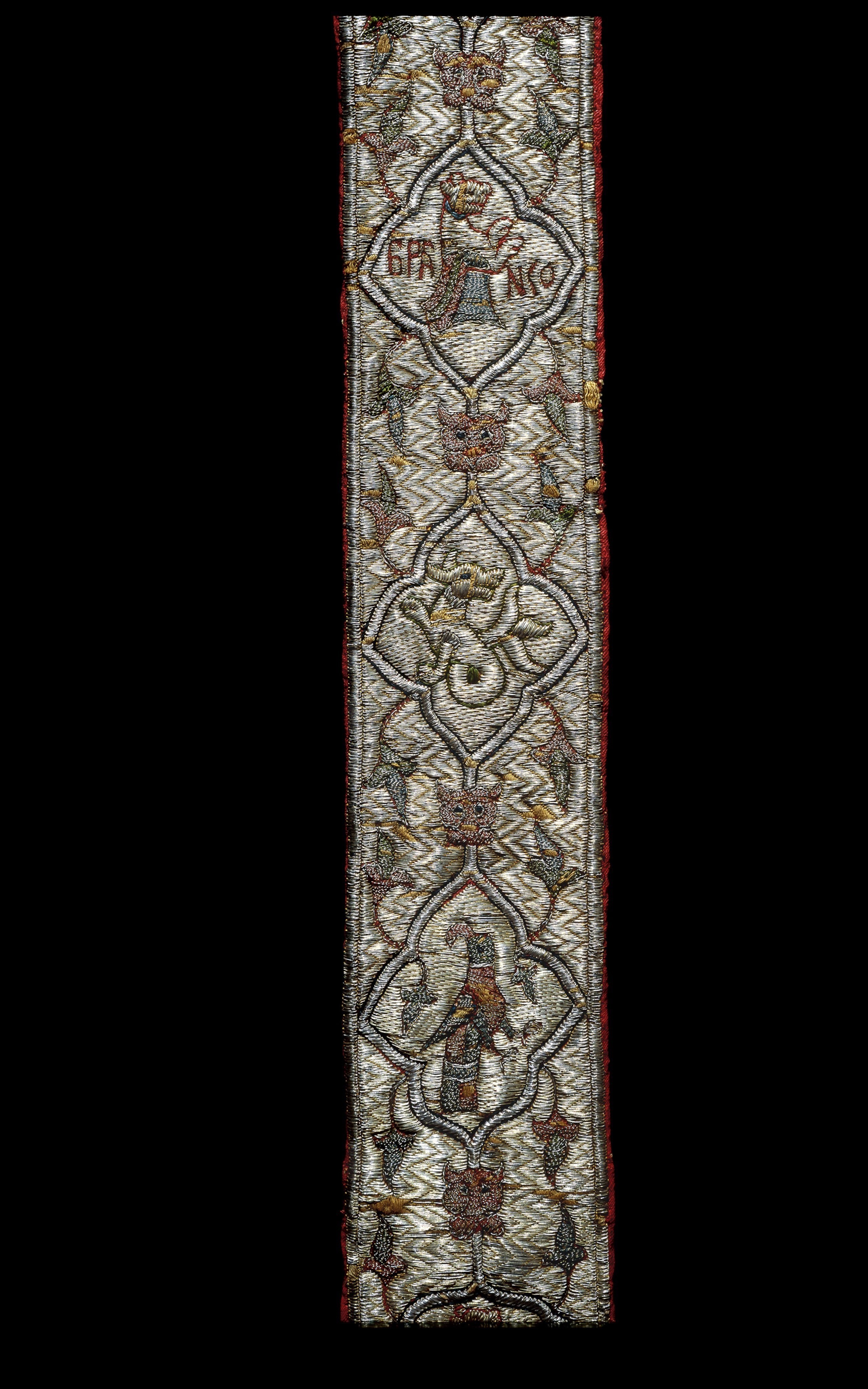
- Branko's belt fragment, kept in The British Museum archives.

sevastokrator (second-highest court title at that time) [of the Serbian Empire]
- Reign: c. 1346–60s
- Born: Serbian Kingdom
- Died: before March 1365
- Noble family: Branković (progenitor)
- Spouse: Unknown (possibly a Nemanjić)
- Issue: Nikola Radonja; Vuk; Grgur; Teodora

Branko (Serbian Cyrillic: Бранко; fl. 1331–65) was a Serbian magnate who served to king and emperor Stefan Dušan (r. 1331–55), and emperor Stefan Uroš V (r. 1355–71), with the titles of sluga and later sevastokrator. A member of an old and respectable family, possibly descending from the Serbian dynasty itself, Branko began his royal service in the nearest circle of the ruler. After the elevation of the Serbian state to the Empire (1346), Branko received the second-highest court title, sevastokrator, usually given to relatives. He governed the Ohrid region (in Macedonia). Branko had three sons and a daughter, of whom Vuk Branković would become an important person in the period of the Fall of the Serbian Empire.

== Origin and early life ==
Branko's father Mladen (fl. 1319–26) was a great dignitary that served the Serbian kings Stefan Milutin (r. 1282–1321) and Stefan Dečanski (r. 1321–31). He first held the title of župan (count), then after successfully performing civil affairs (as a judge) and excelling in military affairs, he became a vojvoda (general), during the reign of Stefan Dečanski. It is unknown whether Mladen lived to serve King Stefan Dušan, as is the case with many other magnates such as vojvoda Vojin and čelnik Gradislav Vojšić. Branko's paternal uncle Nikola (fl. 1329) also had the title of župan, most likely serving as a governor of Lezhë (in northern Albania).

The family was old and respectable. In 1365, Branko's sons stressed that their villages in Drenica (in Kosovo) that they granted to the Hilandar monastery, were "the patrimony of our great-grandfathers, grandfathers, parents, and ours until today", which means that they held it at least in the fourth generation. M. Spremić concluded that the family's hereditary land was Drenica and that it doubtlessly hailed from Kosovo. Spremić also stressed the possibility of the family originating from the Nemanjić dynasty itself; Branko's later appearance as sevastokrator, a title usually given to relatives, points to this. Sources from the period when the Branković dynasty ruled the Serbian Despotate, and later, speak of the family as descending from the Nemanjić dynasty. M. Blagojević maintained that Mladen's ancestry could not be reliably determined, but mentioned the fact that he had a namesake in the son of Grand Prince Vukan Nemanjić (r. 1202–04).

Branko is mentioned with the title of sluga, serving Stefan Dušan when he was still a king (1331–45). The sluga (or peharnik) was the equivalent of the "cup-bearer" (domestikos), and thus, the bearer was in the nearest circle of the monarch, expected to have had a strong influence on the ruler.

== Serbian Empire ==
Emperor Dušan, after being crowned in 1346, gave his closest associates the Byzantine titles of despot, sevastokrator, and kesar. Branko's receival of the title was likely due to kinship ties (as was the case with Dejan); the title was usually given to kinfolk. These high title-holders were governors of provinces southwards from Skoplje, in the part of the empire called "the Greek lands". Branko was the lord of Ohrid (in Macedonia). It is unknown when exactly he received the title. Unlike other older contemporaries of his, Branko did not advance further (to despot). In 1347, his sister Ratoslava married župan Altoman Vojinović (fl. 1333–59), who at first (fl. 1333) was a lord in the vicinity of Ragusa (Dubrovnik), then as a veliki župan in the beginning of the second half of the 14th century held a province in the valley of Gruža. After Dušan's death (1355), Branko continued to serve under Dušan's son and heir Stefan Uroš V (r. 1355–71). His year of death is unknown, and he is no longer mentioned in sources after 1365.

In March 1365, emperor Uroš V issued a charter to Hilandar (on Mount Athos) at the request of Branko's son starac (elder) Roman, who agreed with his brothers Vuk and Grgur to grant the Church of the Holy Archangel to Hilandar. Spremić believes that he died sometime before March 1365. After his death, in the period of the Fall of the Serbian Empire, his sons retreated north, to Drenica. During the reign of Uroš V, his sons Vuk and Grgur held only their hereditary land in Drenica. Branko's oldest son Radonja was married to Jelena, the sister of Uglješa and Vukašin Mrnjavčević. Vuk started expanding his province after the Battle of Maritsa (1371). His daughter Teodora (or Vojislava) married Gjergj Topia, Prince of Albania and Lord of Durazzo.

Branko is the eponymous founder of the Branković noble family.

== Branko's Belt ==
One fragment of Branko's belt was in possession of Austrian Iklé family and was part of the Iklé Collection, this fragment including other items from this collection, was sold in auction to The British Museum, in 1989. Item is kept in the archive and it is not on display. The other fragment of the belt is kept in State Hermitage Museum in Saint Petersburg.

On the preserved parts of the gold embroidery called "Branko's Belt" (Brankov pojas), taken to have been ordered by Branko, a helmet with a crest of a rising lion is depicted, along with the name Branko. The lion, as a motive of monarchial iconography in Serbia, appears in coinage of Stefan Dušan and Stefan Uroš V, and in an independent presentation in a seal of the latter. The lion then disappears from the repertoire of Stefan Uroš V, but is maintained by the Branković family, in various forms. S. Novaković found one fragment of the belt in the collection of the Russian archaeological commission.

== Psalter ==
The Bucharest Psalter (also known in Romanian as Psaltirii sârbeşti, "Serbian Psalter") was written for Branko Mladenović in 1346, and is indexed as "MS 205" in the Library of the Romanian Academy of Sciences. It is one of the Slavonic basis for 16th-century Romanian psalters. The illuminated manuscript includes an image of the Temple of Sophia.

== Family ==
- Unknown
  - Nikola (fl. 1329), župan
  - Mladen (fl. 1319–26), župan and vojvoda.
    - Branko
      - Radonja (fl. 1364–d. 1399), kesar and monk.
      - Vuk (1345–1397), gospodar.
      - Grgur (fl. 1347–61), kesar.
      - Teodora (Vojislava), princess consort of Albania and lady of Durrës

== Annotations ==
1. He is known in historiography with his title, sevastokrator Branko (севастократор Бранко), and patronymic, as Branko Mladenović (Бранко Младеновић).
2. K. Jireček maintained that Branko's father Mladen held a province around Dubrovnik, that Branko was among the magnates who after the conquest of Greek lands took to Macedonia. In the 1319 chrysobull of King Stefan Milutin, it is said that the ruler came to Kotor with a large escort, among whom were Branko, a čelnik. Ferjančić stated that it was difficult to assume that this was Branko Mladenović.
3. In Branko's psalter dated to 1346 he is mentioned without any title. He is mentioned as veliki ("great") sevastokrator several times in a 1365 charter issued by his sons Vuk and Grgur in which they submit some possessions to Hilandar. This, with Uroš V's charter, shows that the doubtless terminus ante quem for the conferment of the title is 1365.

== Sources ==
- Blagojević, Miloš (2001). Државна управа у српским средњовековним земљама [State administration in the Serb medieval lands] (in Serbian). Službeni list SRJ. pp. 32, 33. ISBN 9788635504971.
- Blagojević, Miloš (1989). Србија у доба Немањића [Serbia in the era of the Nemanjić] (in Serbian). TRZ "VAJAT". pp. 166, 218. ISBN 9788670390287.
- Ćorović, Vladimir (2001) [1997]. Историја српског народа [History of the Serb people] (in Serbian) (Internet ed.). Belgrade: Јанус; Ars Libri.
- Dinić, Mihailo (1978). "Област Бранковића". Српске земље у средњем веку [Serb lands in the Middle Ages] (in Serbian). Belgrade: Српска књижевна задруга.
- Ferjančić, Božidar (1970). "Севастократори и кесари у Српском царству" [Sebastocrators and Caesares in the Serbian Empire]. Зборник Филозофског факултета (in Serbian): 255–269.
- Mihaljčić, Rade (1989). Краj Српског царства (2nd ed.). Belgrade: БИГЗ.
- Novaković, Stojan (1908). "Византијски чинови и титуле у српским земљама XI-XV века". Глас СКА. LXXVIII: 178–280.
- Odak, Marina I. (2015). "Ikonografija i simbolika predstava na srpskom srednjovekovnom novcu". Belgrade: Filozofski fakultet.
- Spremić, Momčilo (2005). "Бранковићи у историји и предању". Прекинут успон: српске земље у позном средњем веку. Belgrade: Завод за уџбенике и наставна средства. pp. 329–344.
- Spremić, Momčilo (1994). Деспот Ђурађ Бранковић и његово доба. Belgrade: Српска књижевна задруга.
- Spremić, Momčilo (2004). "La famille serbe des Brankovic - considérations généalogiques et héraldiques" (PDF). Zbornik Radova Vizantološkog Instituta. 41: 441–452. Archived from the original (PDF) on 2012-03-17.
- Spremić, Momčilo (2006). "The Branković line in Ohrid". Vardarski Zbornik. 5: 1–7.
- Tomović, Gordana (2011). Rudić, Srđan (ed.). Vojinovići. Istorijski institut. pp. 355–366. ISBN 978-86-7743-091-7.
- Veselinović, Andrija; Ljušić, Radoš (2002). Родослови српских династија [Genealogies of Serb dynasties] (in Serbian). Платонеум.

Court offices
| New creation | sevastokrator of Stefan Dušan after 1346–before 1355; Served alongside: Jovan Oliver; Dejan | Succeeded by Vlatko as serving Uroš V |
