= Jovan Radonjić =

Guvernadur of Montenegro

- Јован Радоњић

Guvernadur of Montenegro
- In office 1764 – 8 July 1803
- Monarchs: Sava II; Vasilije III; Petar I
- Preceded by: Vukale Stanišić
- Succeeded by: Vukolaj Radonjić

Personal details
- Born: 1748
- Died: 8 July 1803 (aged 54–55)

Jovan Radonjić (Serbian Cyrillic: Јован Радоњић, 1748 – 8 July 1803), commonly known as Jovo (Јово) or Joko, was the Guvernadur of Montenegro between 1764 and 1803.

== Early life ==
Jovan was born in Njeguši, the son of vojvoda and serdar Stanislav Radonjić (1690–1758), the first guvernadur (s. 1756–58). The family belonged to the Radonjić-Rajičević brotherhood of Njeguši.

It is possible that he had an older brother, Vukale, who had served as the guvernadur following Stanislav's death.

== Term during Metropolitan Sava ==
Jovan was elected guvernadur by the assembly in Cetinje in 1764. The young Jovan had the final word in that period in Montenegro; the Venetians, the Vizier of Scutari and surrounding Ottoman pashas and beys turned to him when something needed to be arranged.

The fact that the Republic of Venice, the traditional ally of the Montenegrins, saw negatively on the relations between Russia and Montenegro is evident from a letter sent by Montenegrin chieftains to the provveditore of Kotor Gaetan Molino dated 1 April 1770, which condemns the antagonistic approach by the Venetians to the Montenegrin-Russian relations. The letter was signed by guvernadur Jovan Radonjić, serdar Vukale Vukotić, serdar J. Đurašković, serdar Jovo Petrović, and serdar M. Plamenac. In February 1769, Russian Empress Catherine issued the order to count Aleksije Orlov to organize the planning of an uprising on the Balkans; his assistant was Georgije Dolgorukov, which was sent to Montenegro. Orlov was during this Russo-Turkish war mostly in Italy, so that he was unable to assist Dolgorukov.

In 1773, in the same month of the death of Šćepan Mali, Mehmed Pasha Bushati attacked the Kuči and Bjelopavlići, but was decisively defeated and returned to Scutari.

With the end of Russo-Turkish War (1768–74), the Treaty of Küçük Kaynarca was signed on 21 July 1774. It did not mention Montenegro, which despite that saw in Russia a great hope. In the beginning of August 1775, Jovan sent an extensive petition to the Russian court, not to forget about the Montenegrins.

In 1775–76 there seems to have been armed conflicts between Montenegro and the Republic of Ragusa at their frontier, as Jovan Radonjić suggested them peace.

On 27 April 1779, a letter in Italian signed by Jovan Radonjić, Ivan Petrović, arhimandrit Petar Petrović and conte Pietro Beladinovich to the Austrian Emperor thanked for the gifts sent to them by the Empress through the clerk Heinz. They were most happy with the painting of the Emperor, which they saw as a proof of honour and protection from the Austrian side.

== Term during Metropolitan Petar I ==
=== Conflict with Petar I ===
The Metropolitan and Jovan were the two head chiefs of Montenegro, one by title, the other according to actual position. Jovan sought to rule Montenegro by himself; he appropriated secular rights for himself, and wanted the Metropolitan to exerice only his spiritual leadership; that the guvernadur was the master of the people and the Metropolitan the master of the church.

The two clashed in international politics: the Metropolitan held to Russia, while Jovan relied on Austria. Hence, there were two parties in the land, one "Russophile" and the other "Austrophile", led by the Metropolitan and Jovan, respectively. On the question whether to support Austria or not, the two sides conflicted during the Austro-Turkish War (1787–91) and Russo-Turkish War (1787–92).

During this period, Montenegro was divided into the following districts: Katunska nahija, Riječka nahija, Crmnička nahija, Lješanska nahija and Pješivačka nahija. These were governed by the officials, Jovan Radonjić and the Metropolitan, with the help of 5 serdars, 9 vojvodas and 34 knezes (a synthesis of secular and theocratic government which will cause strife and struggle for supremacy until 1832–1833).

=== Kara Mahmud Pasha's offensive (1785) ===
When Kara Mahmud Pasha's large army advanced towards Montenegro, the Montenegrin army of 8,000 was reduced by 3,000 Crmničani, and they were followed by many more surrenders.

When Jovan saw Mahmud Pasha's army across Bjelica, he set his own house on fire and fled to Venetian territory. Mahmud Pasha went to burn down the Njeguši tribe, but the Nikšići asked him to preserve it, because they had trading relations with them. Mahmud Pasha settled the promised war gift; he gave Milić and knez Martinović two flasks filled with Ottoman copper coins, and 10 ducats each for the service they had done for him. Mahmud Pasha then crossed with his army through Paštrovići to return to Scutari. When the Pasha crossed Paštrovići at the Kašćela height near the church, Rade Andrović and his two friends approached and failed to assassinate him.

=== Letters to Russia (1788–89) ===
In July 1788, he sent a letter to Queen Catherine II: "Now all of us, Serb Montenegrins, ask Your Imperial Grace to send Sofronije Jugović-Marković to us". This Sofronije Marković (self-styled Jugović), was promised by Jovan the throne of Montenegro; Jovan sought to bring him to the land and replace Petrović, then get rid of him too, securing the rule for himself. He sent another letter in 1789.

=== Delegation to Austria (1789–90) ===
Jovan, being the main Austrian supporter in Montenegro, decided to take a trip to Austria. Having faith in Austria, he led a delegation consisting mainly of chieftains from the Crmnica nahija. Beginning to lose his position in Montenegro, he sought to retrieve his reputation with the help of the Austrian court. In the beginning of September 1789, the delegation arrived at Rijeka, then Radonjić and Plamenac crossed over to Trieste, from where they sent a request to Vienna hoping that the delegation would extend their trip to the Austrian capital. Radonjić requested that the Austrian army be sent into Montenegro, which was declined. On Radonjić's re-request, the Austrian Emperor decided to send munition to Montenegro in February 1790, provided that the Montenegrins "come under the wings of the Emperor in war-time, as much as in peace-time, with the Ottoman Empire". Austrian support looked unpromising.

=== Kara Mahmud Pasha's offensive (1796) ===
In 1796, Kara Mahmud Pasha, the Pasha of Scutari, was defeated at the Battle of Martinići. Mahmud Pasha later returned and was defeated and killed at the Battle of Krusi on 22 September. Half of the Montenegrin army was led by Metropolitan Petar I, the other by Jovan.

After the victory, Jovan wrote to Vienna and asked to be compensated for his house that he had earlier burnt down. As the Austrians were satisfied with Jovan's efforts, they sent him money and lumber for the repair of the house.

=== Last years ===
Shortly before his death, Jovan purchased a printing press in Vienna and hired an Austrian to educate the Montenegrins in using it. However, Metropolitan Petar I accused him of bringing an Austrian spy, and charged him of wanting to sell Montenegro to the Austrian Crown. Thus, Jovan gave up on the idea of printing, and sold the press to a merchant in the Bay of Kotor. Several years later, Petar II Petrović-Njegoš brought the same press back to Montenegro.

== Sources ==
- Čubrilović, Vasa (1983). Odabrani istorijski radovi. Narodna knjiga.
- Novak, Viktor (1949). Istoriski časopis. Vol. 1.
- Stanojević, Gligor; Vasić, Milan (1975). Istorija Crne Gore (3): od početka XVI do kraja XVIII vijeka. Titograd: Redakcija za istoriju Crne Gore. OCLC 799489791.
- Glasnik cetinjskih muzeja (1974). Glasnik cetinjskih muzeja. Vol. 7–10.
- Srbsko učeno društvo (1891). Glasnik Srbskog učenog društva. Vol. 72. Državna štamparija.

Preceded by Vukale Stanišić	Guvernadur of Montenegro; 1764 – 1803	Succeeded by Vukolaj Jovanov Radonjić
