= Radonić, Šibenik =

Settlement in Šibenik-Knin County, Croatia

Radonić
- Settlement
- Interactive map of Radonić
- Location of Radonić in Croatia
- Coordinates: 43°45′57″N 16°03′27″E
- Country: Croatia
- County: Šibenik-Knin
- City: Šibenik

Area
  - Total: 4.7 km^{2} (1.8 sq mi)

Population (2021)
  - Total: 93
  - Density: 20/km^{2} (51/sq mi)
- Time zone: UTC+1 (CET)
  - Summer (DST): UTC+2 (CEST)
- Postal code: XXpoštaXX
- Area code: +385 (0)22

Radonić is a settlement in the City of Šibenik in Croatia. In 2021, its population was 93.

== Demographics ==
Radonić: Population trends 1857–2021
v

| population | | | 158 | 159 | 199 | 200 | 226 | 184 | 221 | 237 | 215 | 185 | 159 | 124 | 85 | 79 | 93 |
| | 1857 | 1869 | 1880 | 1890 | 1900 | 1910 | 1921 | 1931 | 1948 | 1953 | 1961 | 1971 | 1981 | 1991 | 2001 | 2011 | 2021 |

Sources: Croatian Bureau of Statistics publications
