= Grgur Golubić =

Serbian noble

CaesarCaesar Gregory ГргурCaesar Gregory Гргур Grgur Golubić - Caesar Gregory Гргур
- kesar
- Born: before 1327
- Died: before 16 July 1398
- Family: Branković
- Spouse: Todora
- Father: Branko Mladenović
- Occupation: Governor of Polog

Grgur Golubić (Serbian Cyrillic: Гргур Голубић, кесар Гргур; fl. 1347–61) was a Serbian nobleman who served Emperors Stefan Dušan (r. 1331–55) and Stefan Uroš V as kesar (caesar). He was the son of sevastokrator Branko Mladenović.

Grgur was the second son of sevastokrator Branko Mladenović, the governor of Ohrid under Emperor Dušan (fl. 1346). His older brother was Nikola Radonja (d. 1399) and his younger brother was Vuk Branković (1345–1397). His cousin was magnate Nikola Altomanović (fl. 1348–76), whose mother Ratoslava was Grgur's paternal aunt. His grandfather was vojvoda Mladen (fl. 1323–26), who served kings Stefan Milutin (r. 1282–1321) and Stefan Dečanski (r. 1321–31), and was mentioned as having governed Trebinje and Dračevica in 1323. Grgur was first mentioned in March 1347, as a kesar, in a letter from Pope Innocentius VI to Emperor Dušan. Grgur is mentioned in charters authored by Dušan dating to 1348–54 of the Monastery of the Holy Archangels in Prizren, which point to that Grgur held a region around Prizren. Grgur and bishop Grigorije of Devol founded the Zaum monastery (Church of the Holy Virgin Zaumska, Bogorodica Zahumska) on Lake Ohrid near Zaum, to which he brought the cult of the Virgin of Zahumlje (hence its name). A Grgur ruled the oblast (province) of Polog, in what is today northwestern North Macedonia, but it is uncertain whether this is the same Grgur or some otherwise unknown noble.

== Sources ==
- Jugoslavenski Leksikografski Zavod (1980). Enciklopedija Jugoslavije: Bje-Crn. Jugoslavenski Leksikografski Zavod. pp. 404–405. ISBN 9788670530133.
- Recueil de travaux de l'Institut des études byzantines (Zbornik radova). Vol. 34. Institut. 1995. p. 173. ISBN 978-86-83883-09-7.
- Soulis, George Christos (1984), The Serbs and Byzantium during the reign of Tsar Stephen Dušan (1331-1355) and his successors, Dumbarton Oaks Library and Collection, p. 215, ISBN 978-0-88402-137-7
- Petrovski, Boban, Воисава Трибалда (Voisava Tribalda) (PDF)
- Mihaljčić, Rade (1975). Крај Српског царства [End of the Serbian Empire]. JSrpska književna zadruga - Belgrade.
