= Vuk Branković =

Medieval Serbian nobleman

- Gospodin (lord)
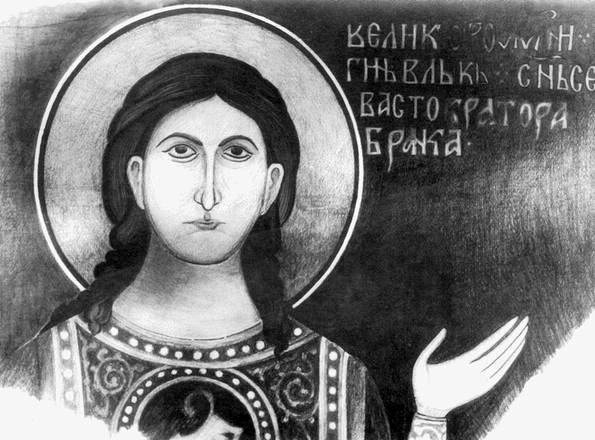
- Vuk, 18 years old (ca. 1363), fresco work in the Holy Mother of God church, Ohrid
- Reign: 1371–1396
- Successor: Đurađ Branković
- Born: 1345
- Died: 6 October 1397 (aged 51–52)
- Spouse: Mara Lazarević
- Issue: Grgur Vuković; Đurađ Branković; Lazar Vuković
- House: Branković
- Father: Branko Mladenović
- Religion: Eastern Orthodoxy

Vuk Branković (Serbian Cyrillic: Вук Бранковић, pronounced [ʋûːk brǎːnkoʋit͡ɕ], 1345 – 6 October 1397) was a Serbian medieval nobleman who, during the Fall of the Serbian Empire, inherited a province that extended over present-day southern and southwestern Serbia, entire Kosovo, the northern part of present-day Republic of North Macedonia, and northern Montenegro. His fief (and later state) was known as Oblast Brankovića (District of Branković) or simply as Vukova zemlja (Vuk's land), which he held with the title of gospodin (lord, sir), under Prince Lazar of Serbia. After the Battle of Kosovo (1389), Vuk was briefly the de facto most powerful Serbian lord.

== Origins ==
Branković was born in 1345 and belonged to a Serb noble family that held a prominent role in the 14th century. Vuk was a son of Branko Mladenović (died before 1365), who received the high court title of sevastokrator from Emperor Stefan Dušan (r. 1331–1355) and served as governor of Ohrid (present-day North Macedonia). Vuk's grandfather was Mladen (died after 1326), who was župan (count) in Trebinje under King Stefan Milutin (1282–1321) and vojvoda (duke) under King Stefan Dečanski (1321–1331). Later chronicles alleged that the Branković were descended from Vukan Nemanjić, son of Stefan Nemanja.

== Expansion ==
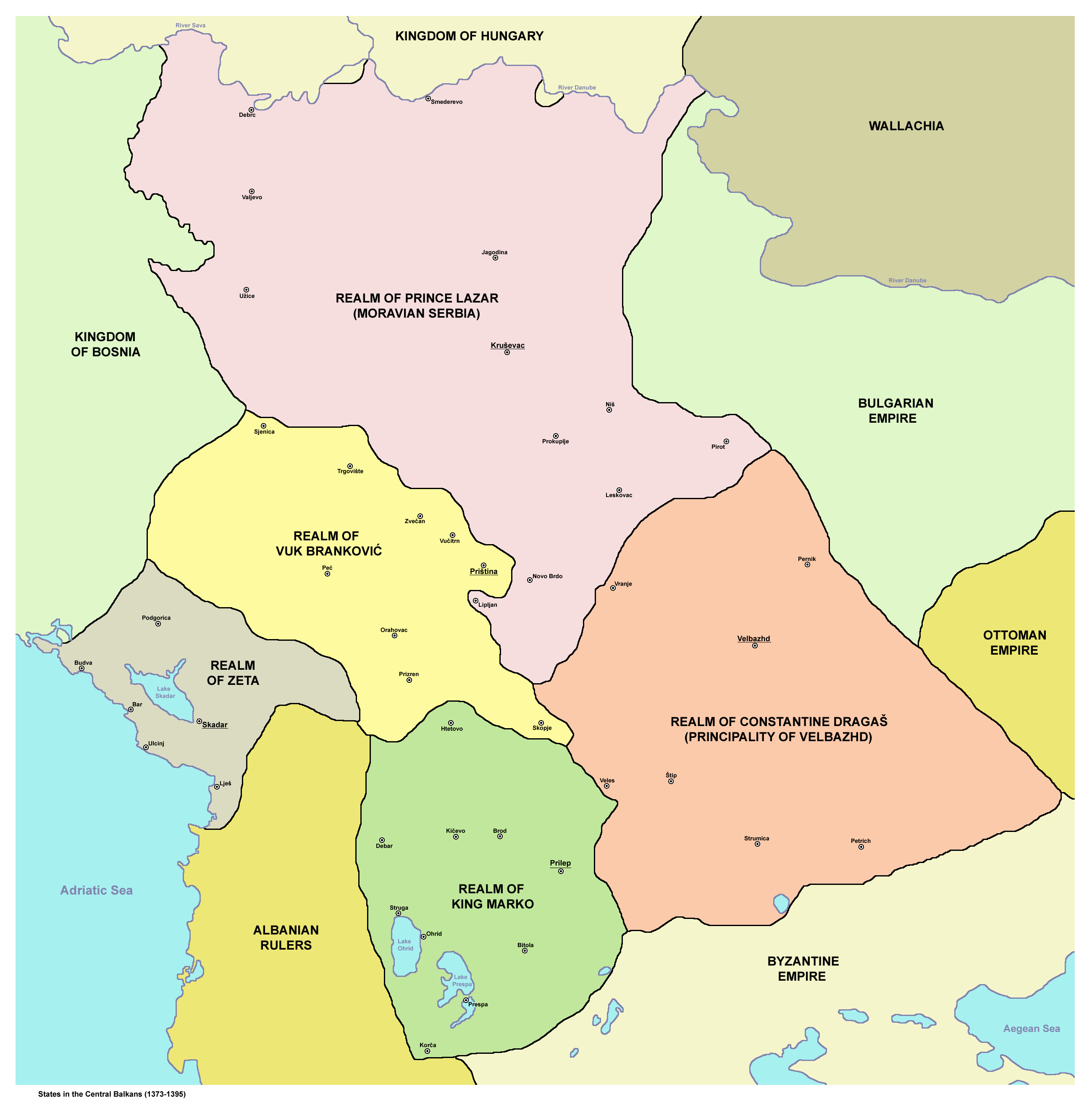
States in the Central Balkans (including Realm of Vuk Branković) in 1373–1395

After their father's death, Vuk and his brothers Grgur and Nikola Radonja retreated to the valley of Drenica (central Kosovo). During the final years of Stefan Uroš V's rule, Grgur and Vuk's governance was limited to their heritance in Drenica. Vuk took advantage of the death of King Vukašin in the Battle of Maritsa (1371) and conquered Sjenica, Zvečan and part of the Lim River valley.

Vuk's marriage to Mara, the daughter of the most powerful Serbian magnate prince Lazar Hrebeljanović, brought him substantial lands in Kosovo. This marriage sealed the alliance between two houses and secured Lazar's assistance for Vuk's future plans, although Vuk in return had to acknowledge Lazar as his feudal senior. Soon after the marriage, Lazar and King Tvrtko I of Bosnia attacked župan Nikola Altomanović, who ruled in the western part of Serbia, and conquered and divided his lands in 1373. In the partition of Altomanović's land, Vuk got areas of Raška (including the old Serbian capital Ras) and lands in Polimlje (northern Montenegro). After the death of Đurađ I Balšić (13 January 1378), Vuk captured his cities of Prizren and Peć (Peja), and the area of Metohija.

At its peak, the realm of Branković stretched from Sjenica in the west to Skopje in the east, with the cities of Pristina and Vushtrri serving as its capitals. The most important cities in Vuk's province were Priština, Prizren, Peć, Skopje and Ras, as well as the rich mining settlements of Trepča, Janjevo, Gluhavica and others.

== Battle of Kosovo ==
Kosovo Field with probable disposition of troops before the battle

After the Battle of Maritza, the Ottomans forced the southern Serbian feudal lords (in present-day Macedonia and Greece), Konstantin Dragaš, King Marko, Toma Preljubović and others, to become their vassals and started to attack the northern Serbian lands ruled by prince Lazar and Vuk. After initial Serbian successes at the battles of Dubravnica (1381), Pločnik (1386) and Bileća (1388), the Ottomans launched a full-scale attack on Serbia, aiming at the very heartland of Vuk's realm in central Kosovo. In the epic Battle of Kosovo (1389), Vuk participated along with his father-in-law Lazar and a contingent of King Tvrtko's army.

Unlike Lazar, who died in the battle along with most of his army, Vuk managed to survive and preserve his army, which later gave material for a popular Serbian folk tradition (represented in folk epic poems and tales) that he betrayed Lazar in order to become supreme ruler of Serbia, a theory that is rejected by modern-day Serbian historians but not by the Serb people. Despite the consensus of modern historiography in Serbia that Vuk Branković was not a traitor in the Battle of Kosovo in 1389, Momčilo Spremić emphasized that there is a possibility that Vuk really betrayed his Serbian allies.

== Last years ==
After the Battle of Kosovo, Vuk refused to become an Ottoman vassal (unlike prince Stefan Lazarević, son of prince Lazar, who became an Ottoman vassal in late 1389) and started to plan anti-Ottoman action together with the Hungarian king Sigismund. However, Vuk was unable to resist the Ottomans for long. In 1392, they captured Skopje and forced Vuk to become their vassal and pay tribute. Even after that, Vuk showed some resistance to the Ottomans, refusing to participate on the Ottoman side in the battles of Rovine (1395) and Nicopolis (1396), unlike other Serbian lords such as prince Stefan, prince Marko and Konstantin Dejanović. He also maintained contacts with Hungary. Finally, the Ottomans ended this situation by attacking Vuk in 1395–96, seizing his land, and giving most of it to prince Stefan Lazarević, while Vuk himself was imprisoned and died in an Ottoman prison. A small part of Vuk's land with the towns of Priština and Vučitrn was given to his sons to hold as Ottoman vassals.

== Family ==
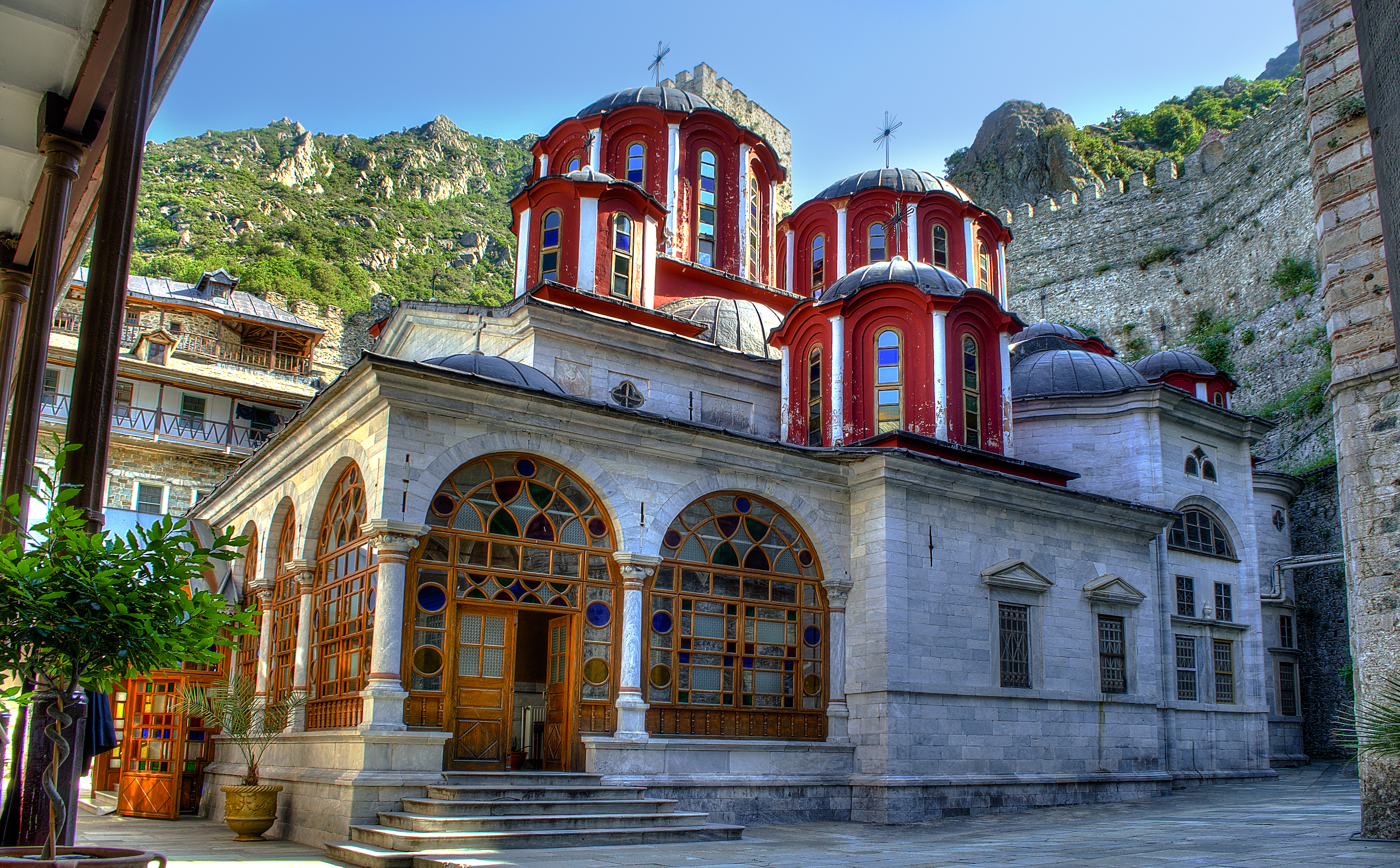
Agiou Pavlou monastery, restored by Vuk Branković

He married Mara (Marija), the daughter of Lazar of Serbia and Milica Nemanjić, in 1371. She died on April 12, 1426. They had three sons:

- Grgur Vuković (1377 – 13 March 1408),
- Đurađ Branković (1377 – 24 December 1456), succeeded his maternal uncle Stefan Lazarević as Despot of Serbia (Serbian Despotate), ruling 1427–1456
- Lazar Vuković (died 12 July 1410), knez

== Titles ==
He is most often titled "Lord Vuk" (господин Вук), while he signed himself "Lord of Serbs and Podunavlje" (господар Срба и Подунавља). The Serbian Church had in the period between 1374 and 1379 accepted knez Lazar as "Lord of Serbs and Podunavlje". According to historian Rade Mihaljčić, when Vuk claimed the title, Stefan Lazarević was around 15 years old (ca. 1392). Vuk was not recognized with that title, as it was preserved for Lazar and Lazar's son Stefan.

== People of his court ==
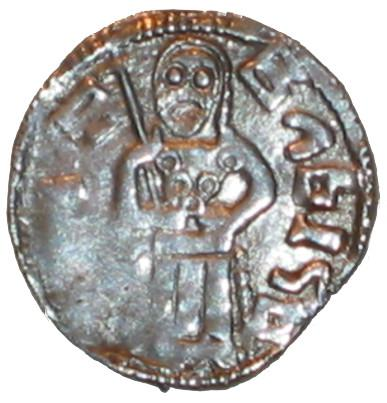
Coin of Vuk Branković

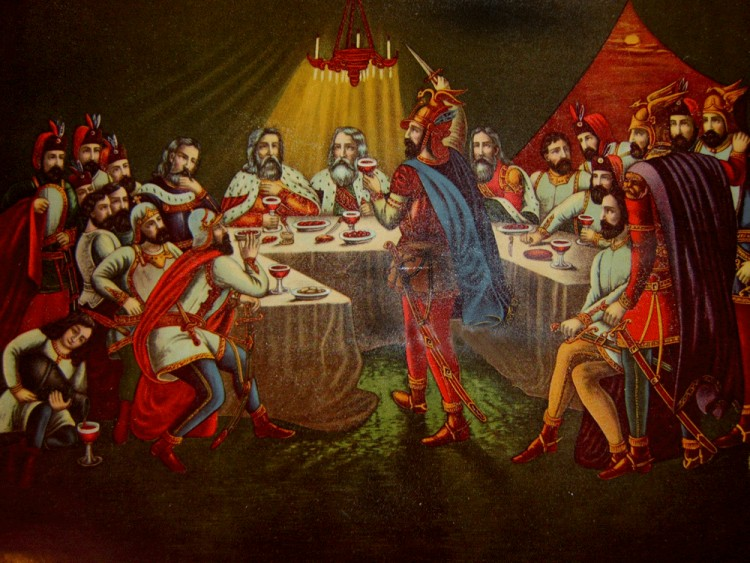
Prince's Supper (1871) by Adam Stefanović and Pavle Čortanović

- Braiko Pekpal (fl. 1374)
- Vlatko Hranotić
- Dragosav
- Jakov
- Nikola (c. 1389), kefalija
- Nikolica (c. 1389), dijak
- Pribil Kućinić
- Todor Hamirović, vojvoda Prnjak and čelnik Smil (fl. 1387)
- Stefan (fl. 1395), chancellor
- Todor, son of Žegar (fl. 1387)

== Legacy ==
Folk tradition portraits Vuk as a traitor in the Kosovo Myth: supposedly, Vuk tarnished the family name when he betrayed Prince Lazar at the Battle of Kosovo, which he survived in 1389. This tradition is apocryphal.
