= Guvernadur =

Gubernatorial title

Guvernadur of Montenegro
- Coat of arms

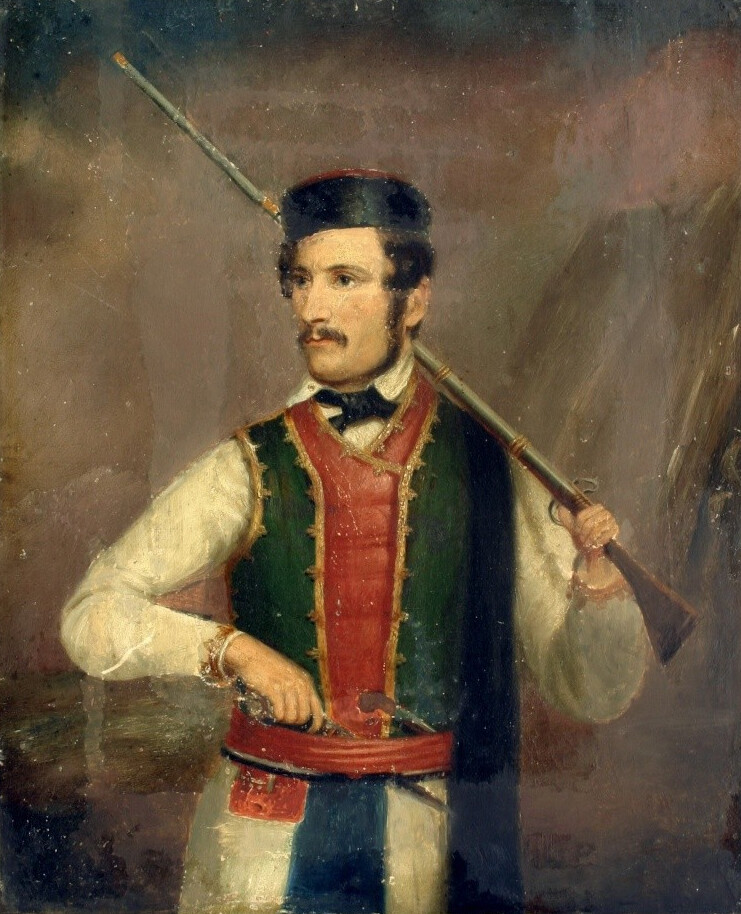
- Vukolaj Radonjić
- Residence: Cetinje, Montenegro
- Formation: 1756
- First holder: Stanislav Radonjić
- Final holder: Vukolaj Radonjić
- Abolished: 1832

The title of guvernadur ("governor", Italian: governatore) was used by the Prince-Bishopric of Montenegro, initially as the diplomatic office between Montenegro and the Republic of Venice, and later evolved into the counterpart to the Metropolitan as the sovereign. The post was abolished in 1832 by Petar II.

== Venetian diplomatic title ==
Danilo I allowed the establishment of the post "in order to appease the Republic of Venice", the office being held by a civilian governor whose main role was to protect Venetian interests in Montenegro.

There are conflicting views about who was the first guvernadur in Montenegro. Some think that the first guvernadur was Jovan Anthony guvernadur Bolica, "governatore del Monte Negro" (1688–1692), crew chief of the military in the Republic of Venice on Cetinje. Montenegro's first guvernadur was Djikan Vukotic, whose son Vukajle refused to be first guvernadur due to the suspicion that his father was poisoning Venetians because they were dissatisfied with his work. Some historians believe Vukota Ozrinic was the first, while a state Vukota Vukotic, and some believe that the Vukajle Vukotic agreed to become guvernadur in 1711. Then came Stefan Kovacevic (Cuca) and Vukadin Vukotic (Cevo) (1739–1742). Guvernadurs were also established in Kuči, which belonged to the Venice.

== Montenegrin aristocratic title ==
Stanislav Radonjić was the first hereditary guvernadur. Guvernadurs from the Radonjić family held this hereditary position of a definite political influence and its effects were in opposition to the Petrović-Njegoš dynasty of the Prince-Bishopric.

=== List of hereditary guvernadurs from Radonjić family ===
- Stanislav Popov Radonjić (1756–1758)
- Vukale Stanišić Radonjić (1758–1764)
- Jovan Stanišić Radonjić (1764–1803)
- Vukolaj Jovanov Radonjić (1803–1832)

== See also ==
- Prime Minister of Montenegro
- List of monarchs of Montenegro
