= Nikola Radonja =

Serbian nobleman (c. 1330–1399)

- Caesar
- Reign: ? – 1364
- Died: 3 December 1399; Agiou Pavlou monastery, Athos
- Noble family: Branković dynasty
- spouse: Jelena, a sister of Uglješa Mrnjavčević
- Father: Branko Mladenović
- Occupation: Serbian nobleman and priest

Nikola Radonja (Serbian: Никола Радоња) or Nikola Radonja Branković or Gerasim or Roman, (c. 1330 – 1399) was a 14th-century Serbian nobleman and chronicler, a member of the Branković dynasty as the eldest son of Branko Mladenović. He is remembered as the author of "Gerasim's Chronicle."

== Name ==
In documents he was referred with one or two out of four different names he had during his life: Nikola, Radonja (Radohna), Roman and Gerasim.

== Early life ==
Radonja was a member of the Branković dynasty as the eldest son of Branko Mladenović. Radonja's younger brothers were Vuk Branković and Grgur Branković. He was married to Jelena, a sister of Uglješa Mrnjavčević. Radonja had a title of caesar (Serbian: ћесар) and controlled an estate in Serres region where he and his wife Jelena lived with their two daughters.

== Monastic life ==
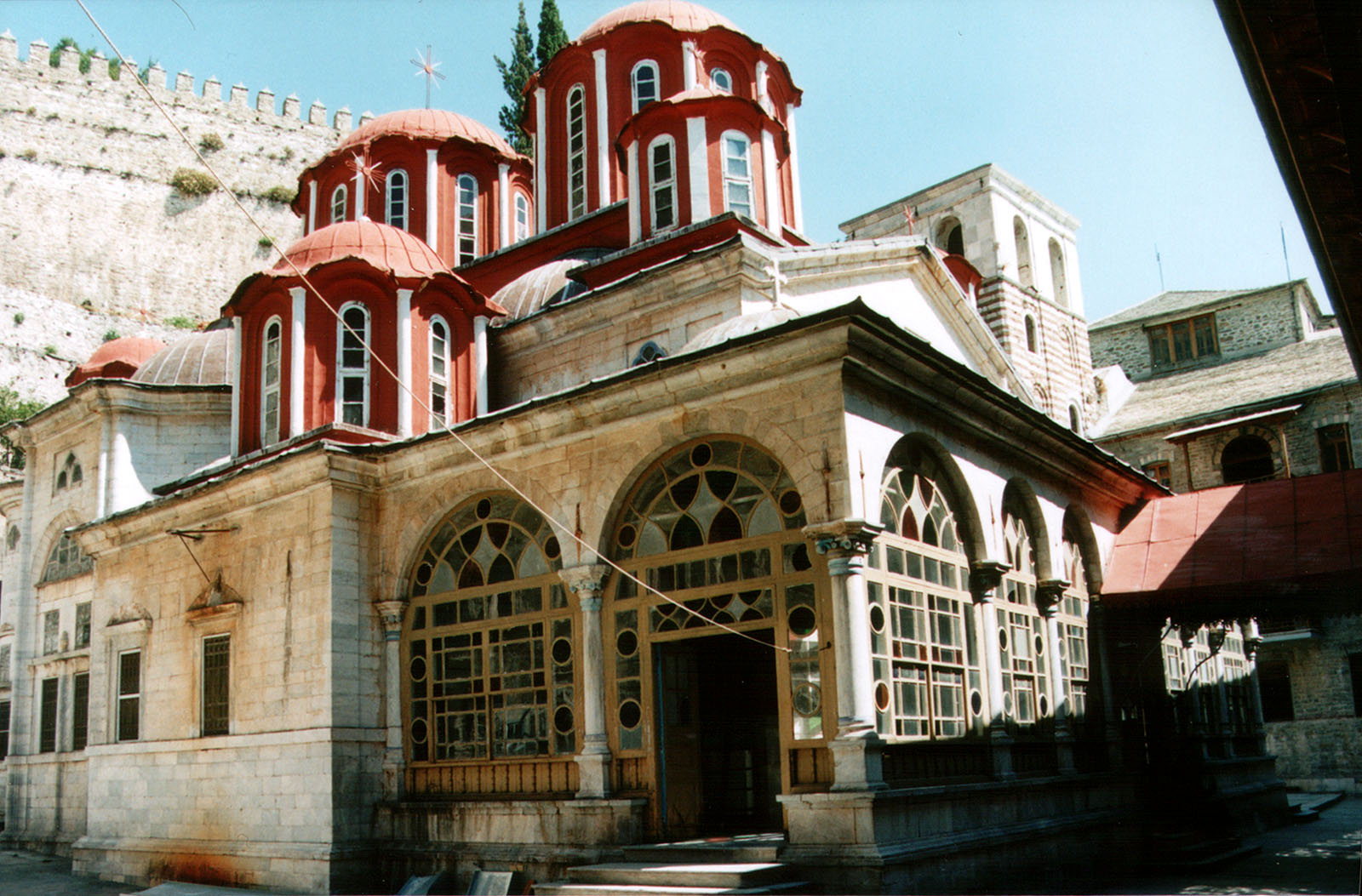
Agiou Pavlou monastery

When his wife and daughters died at very young ages, Radonja resigned his feudal position and after Autumn 1364 took monastic vows and name Gerasim while his father Branko Mladenović was still alive. There he served and helped with great merit Hilendar and also the monasteries of Koutloumousiou and Agiou Pavlou monastery. Thanks to the Radonja's influence, Vuk Branković became the first of Serbian feudal lords who gained ktitor's privileges in Hilandar after the fall of the Serbian Empire, beginning in 1371. The earliest mention of Radonja under his monastic name Gerasim was in a charter of Vuk Branković issued to Hilandar Monastery in 1376/77. Around 1380 Radonja, together with Arsenije Bagaš, bought ruined Agiou Pavlou monastery from Xeropotamou Monastery and reconstructed it. In period 1379—89 Radonja was a priest in the Hilandar Monastery and was again mentioned as Gerasim, a brother of Vuk Branković, in the 1389 document written by Prince Lazar. There he achieved hieroschemamonk degree of Eastern Orthodox monasticism. Around 1392 Radonja and group of notable "elders" from Hilandar visited court of the Lazarević family, successors of Prince Lazar, and requested a church in Ibar and its estates to be granted to Hilandar, according to the promise given by its former lord, Obrad Dragoslavić.

After the death of Vuk Branković in 1396, Radonja took Vuk's body to the Agiou Pavlou monastery on Mount Athos.

Radonja died on 3 December 1399 probably in Agiou Pavlou monastery.

== Gerasim's Chronicle ==
Nikola Radonja, as monk Gerasim, was one of the people who was represented in the Serbian historical drama/war film Battle of Kosovo set in 1389, in interpretation of the actor Tanasije Uzunović. According to some speculations, Radonja was author of the Gerasim's Chronicle (Serbian: Герасимов летопис), allegedly disappeared at the beginning of the 20th century, which supposedly explains that Miloš killed sultan Murad with a spear during the Battle of Kosovo in 1389.
