= Montenegro–Russia relations =

- Montenegro: Russia

Diplomatic mission
- Embassy of Montenegro, Moscow: Embassy of Russia, Podgorica

Montenegro–Russia relations (Russian: Российско-черногорские отношения; Montenegrin: rusko-crnogorski odnosi / руско-црногорски односи) are foreign relations between Montenegro and Russia. Montenegro has an embassy in Moscow and Russia has an embassy in Podgorica.

== History ==
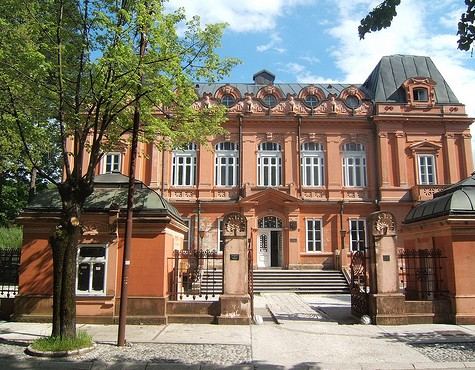
Former Russian embassy in Cetinje, used until the end of the rule of Nicholas I

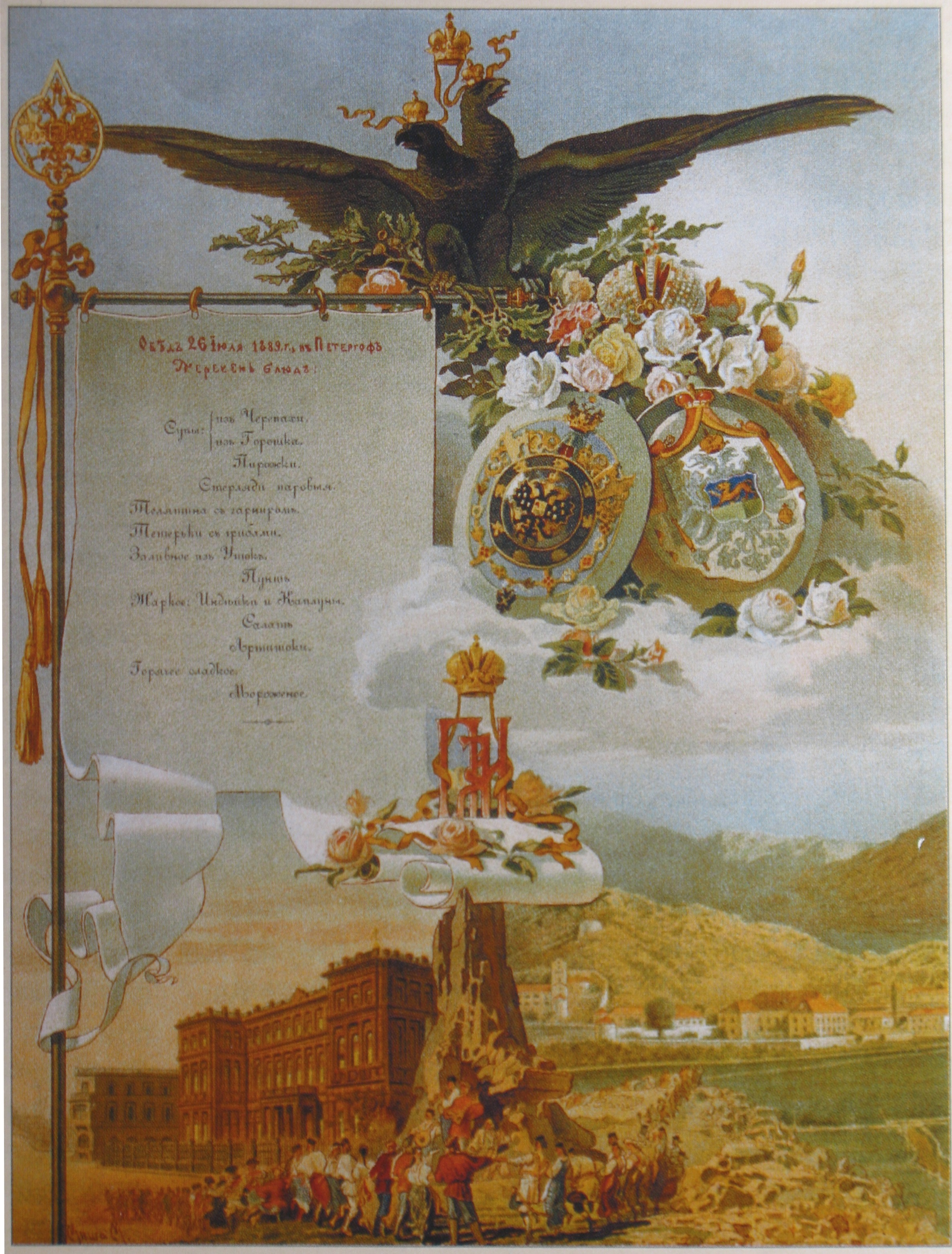
Menu for the wedding of Grand Duke Peter Nikolaevich of Russia with Princess Milica of Montenegro (1889) by Mikhail Mikeshin

=== Early modern period ===
Owing to Rákóczi's War of Independence (1703–1711), the position of Serbian militiamen in the Military Frontier of the Habsburg monarchy was endangered. In 1704 the first Serbian attempts were made to offer their services to Imperial Russia in the latter's struggle against the Ottomans. Prior to the beginning of the Russo-Turkish War (1710–11) Russian emperor Peter the Great invited Serbian militiamen and Serbs in general to join the Russian forces. In 1711 the third delegation sent to Russia by metropolitan Danilo arrived in St. Petersburg. The first Russian delegation to Montenegro arrived on 3 March 1711. Peter the Great called the Balkan Orthodox to rise up against the Ottomans during the Pruth River Campaign.

In 1715–16, Montenegrin metropolitan Danilo I travelled to St. Petersburg from where he returned in April 1716 with two diplomas signed by Emperor Peter the Great, the first which obliged the Montenegrins to aid the Russians in case of war with the Ottomans, the second an annual aid of 500 rubels to the Cetinje Monastery.

Šćepan Mali was an impostor of Peter III of Russia who sought to rule Montenegro. He supported Sava Petrović as bishop when the Montenegrin tribes supported Arsenije Plamenac.

During the office of Metropolitan Petar I, he and guvernadur Jovan Radonjić were the two head chiefs of Montenegro, one by title, the other according to actual position. The two clashed in international politics: the Metropolitan held to Russia, while Jovan relied on Austria. On the question whether to support Austria or not, the two sides conflicted during the Austro-Turkish War (1787–1791) and Russo-Turkish War (1787–1792).

=== 19th century to 1918 ===
The Russian Empire opened a consulate in Kotor in the Habsburg monarchy in October 1804. It was to serve as "protection of the people of Montenegro and Brda". It was officially recognized by the Austrians that same month. Among active Russian emissaries in Montenegro were Mazurevsky (the deputy) and Marko Ivelić. In 1806, the Russian–Montenegrin force under Dmitry Senyavin took Kotor, but handed it over to the French.

Petar I conceived a plan in 1807 to revive a Serbian Empire ("Slaveno–Serb empire"), which he informed the Russian court. It envisioned Russia as the suzerain; the title of Serbian emperor would be held by the Russian emperor. It was thwarted by the French–Russian peace treaty.

Nicholas I of Montenegro, the last king of Montenegro, exchanged support with the Russian monarchy. In 1868 he undertook a journey to Russia, where he received an affectionate welcome from the Tsar Alexander II. Two of King Nicholas's daughters were married to Romanov Grand Dukes, Princess Milica and Princess Anastasija. Under Nicholas I, Montenegro was an ally of Russia in the Russo-Japanese War. Volunteers from Montenegro were fighting in the Russian Army. In 2006 Japan recognized Montenegrin independence and declared an end to the war. A peace treaty was signed.

=== Yugoslav period ===
During that period, Russia and Montenegro were part of the Soviet Union and Yugoslavia, respectively.

=== NATO membership and escalation of tensions ===
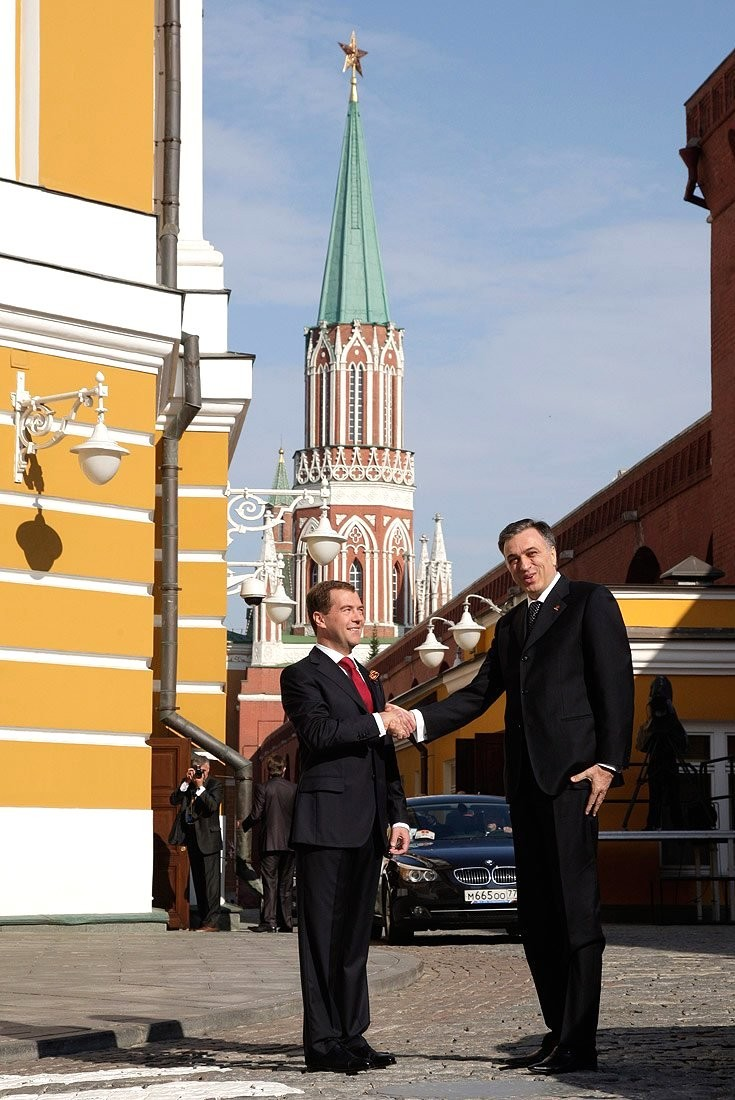
Dmitry Medvedev, President of Russia, and Filip Vujanović, President of Montenegro, in Moscow, 2010.

A poll in July 2015 from the Centre for Democracy and Human Rights, which received financial support from NATO, found that 36.6 percent supported membership, to 37.3 percent against, with sharp divisions between ethnic groups: 71.2 percent of Montenegrin Albanians and 68 percent of Montenegrin Bosniaks supported membership, while only 11.3 percent of Montenegrin Serbs did. In June 2015, NATO Secretary General Jens Stoltenberg said that low public support for NATO could affect whether Montenegro was able to join the alliance. In December 2015, the spokesman for Russian president Vladimir Putin said that Montenegro's accession to NATO was bound to result in "retaliatory actions".

In October 2016 a Russian backed group of Serbians plotted to storm the parliament and assassinate Milo Đukanović, the then-prime minister, to mount a coup with opposition parties and thwart the plan to join NATO. The plot was uncovered and 14 people, including two alleged members of Russian intelligence services were charged, tried and sentenced to long terms in prison.

In late April 2017, after the Montenegrin parliament approved the country's accession to the alliance, the Russian Foreign Ministry issued a statement that said the decision to join NATO had been made by means of defying "the will of nearly half the country′s population that comes out against" the accession. A Russian establishment analyst commented that NATO needed Montenegro for launching a hybrid war and destabilising Europe. Tensions between the countries increased dramatically thereafter, with Montenegro accusing Russia of meddling in its internal affairs and banning entry to specified Russian nationals, including such top Russian officials as Dmitry Rogozin, Nikolai Patrushev, and Ramzan Kadyrov.

On 5 June 2017, the day Montenegro formally joined NATO, the Russian foreign ministry said, "In the light of the hostile course chosen by the Montenegrin authorities, the Russian side reserves the right to take retaliatory measures on a reciprocal basis. In politics, just as in physics, for every action there is an opposite reaction."

=== 2022 to date ===
Since the Russian invasion of Ukraine in February 2022, Russia has continued to interfere in Montenegro politics, often through Serbia, where some nationalist Serbs deny the distinct identity and history of the Montenegrin nation and utilising the presence of the Serbian Orthodox Church and Serbian media to promote Russia.

Around 13,000 Russian citizens have fled Russia and settled in Montenegro in the first year after the war started and have set up 4,000 businesses. Russians accounted for 40% of real estate sales in early 2022. In July 2022 Montenegro began the process of freezing real estate owned by Russian nationals.

In September 2022 Montenegro expelled six Russian diplomats, accusing them of spying and rescinded the visas of twenty eight Russian citizens. In return Russia's embassy in Podgorica was closed.

== Economy ==
Russia plays a big role in the Montenegrin economy. In 2012, Monstat reported that Russian businessmen have majority shares 32% of foreign enterprises present in Montenegro.

=== Tourism ===
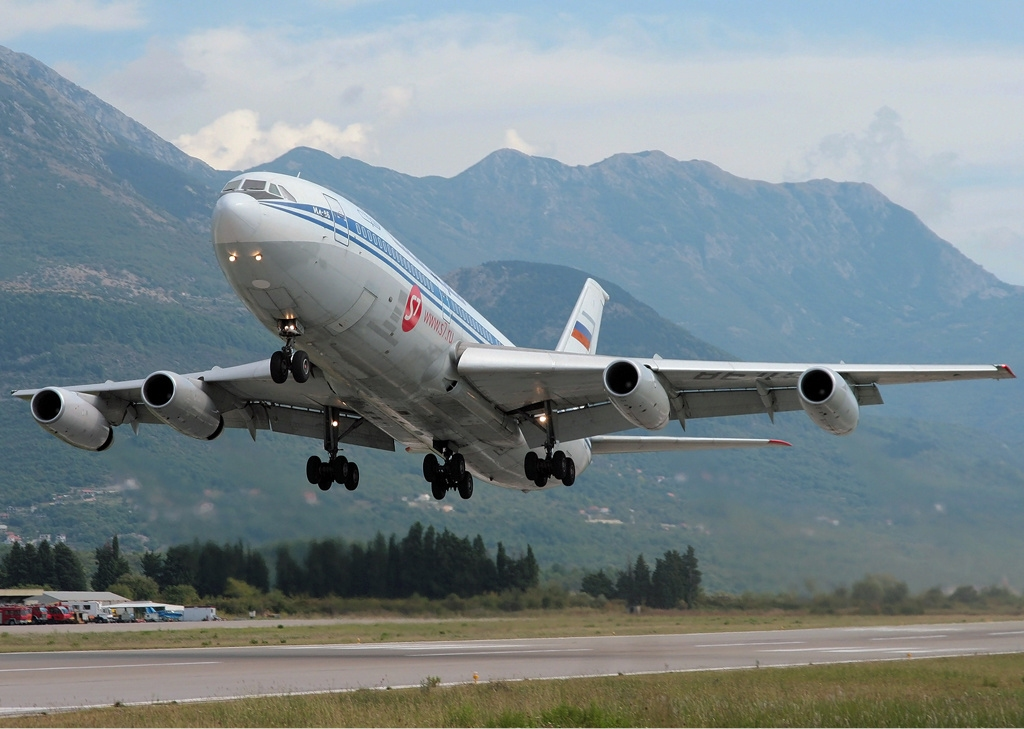
An S7 Airlines Il-86 (not used after 2009) taking off from Tivat, Montenegro.

Montenegro and Russia established a mutual visa-free regime for travelers between the two countries in 2008, though Montenegro is reintroducing visas for Russian citizens as of November 2026. Montenegro is recognized as one of the most popular destinations among Russian tourists. In the summer of 2011, Russians composed of over 20% of all the tourists that visited Montenegro.

=== Controversies ===
==== Privatization ====
Up until the dissolution of Serbia and Montenegro, the majority of business enterprises in Montenegro were state-owned. Following independence, mass privatization swallowed up many of Montenegro's former-state companies. Privatization in Montenegro has been recognized among Russian officials as a matter of controversy since 2005, when Vladimir Vaniev (at the time representing the Russian Consulate in Podgorica) said sarcastically in a press conference regarding the privatization of Montenegrin aluminum-producer KAP that "he didn't know that Montenegro was the 51st state of the United States." Vaniev also accused the Montenegrin press of being funded "in dollars" by the United States in order to support a disproportionate privatization wave for the benefit of American interests.

==== Property ownership ====
The dissolution of the Serbo-Montenegrin union also led to large swaths of property being sold to eccentric profiles under controversial exchanges. Russian press claimed in 2012 that Russian citizens own at least 40% of real-estate property in all of Montenegro. In 2009, Croatian news portal Globus called Montenegro a "Russian colony", accusing Milo Đukanović of manipulative strategies in post-independence privatizations for the benefits of non-Montenegrins, especially Russian tycoons.

On 3 October, 2019, the government of Montenegro announced that it was receiving applications for its citizenship-for-investment programme that will last until December 2022. The very first "golden passport" of Montenegro after the opening of the borders was received by a citizen of Russia.

== Resident diplomatic missions ==
- Montenegro has an embassy in Moscow.
- Russia has an embassy in Podgorica.
  - List of ambassadors of Russia to Montenegro

== See also ==
- Foreign relations of Montenegro
- Foreign relations of Russia
- Soviet Union–Yugoslavia relations

== Sources ==
- Čubrilović, Vasa (1983). Odabrani istorijski radovi. Narodna knjiga.
- Raspopović, Radoslav M. (1996). Дипломатија Црне Горе: 1711-1918. Историјски институт Црне Горе. ISBN 9788670150089.
- Stamatović, Aleksandar (1999). "Митрополија црногорска за вријеме митрополита Петровића". Кратка историја Митрополије Црногорско-приморске (1219-1999).
- Stanojević, Gligor; Vasić, Milan (1975). Istorija Crne Gore (3): od početka XVI do kraja XVIII vijeka. Titograd: Redakcija za istoriju Crne Gore. OCLC 799489791.
- International Affairs. Vol. 50. Znanye. 2004. pp. 156–162+.
