= Battle of Lopate =

1796 battle between Old Montenegro and the Ottoman Empire

Coordinates: 42.150282°N 21.664582°E

- Part of the Ottoman wars in Europe
Date	October 1796
Location	Lopate, Montenegro
Result	Draw

Belligerents
Montenegro	Pashalik of Scutari

Commanders and leaders
Unknown	Unknown

Strength
Unknown	Unknown

Casualties and losses
~40	~40

The Battle of Lopate (Serbian: Bitka na Lopatama) took place in 1796 between Montenegro and the Ottoman Empire near Lopate. Using Mahmut-pasha Bushatli's attack on Montenegro (see Battle of Krusi), Ottoman forces from Nikšić, Kolašin, Bihor, Bijelo Polje, Gusinje; likewise from Foča, Gacko, Stolac, Blagaj, Nevesinje, Trebinje and Korjenići; began advancing to the Montenegrin border. In early October 1796, when the Battle of Krusi occurred, a unit was organized, consisting of the soldiers from the mentioned towns. This unit attacked the mountains of Morača (Mount Lopatice, near Lopate) against the tribespeople of Trebjesa, Morača and Rovci. The unit suffered noticeable casualties. According to available sources, both sides lost about forty people.

== See also ==
- Battle of Martinići
- Battle of Krusi
