= Petar I Petrović-Njegoš =

Prince-Bishop of Montenegro

- Prince-Bishop of Montenegro
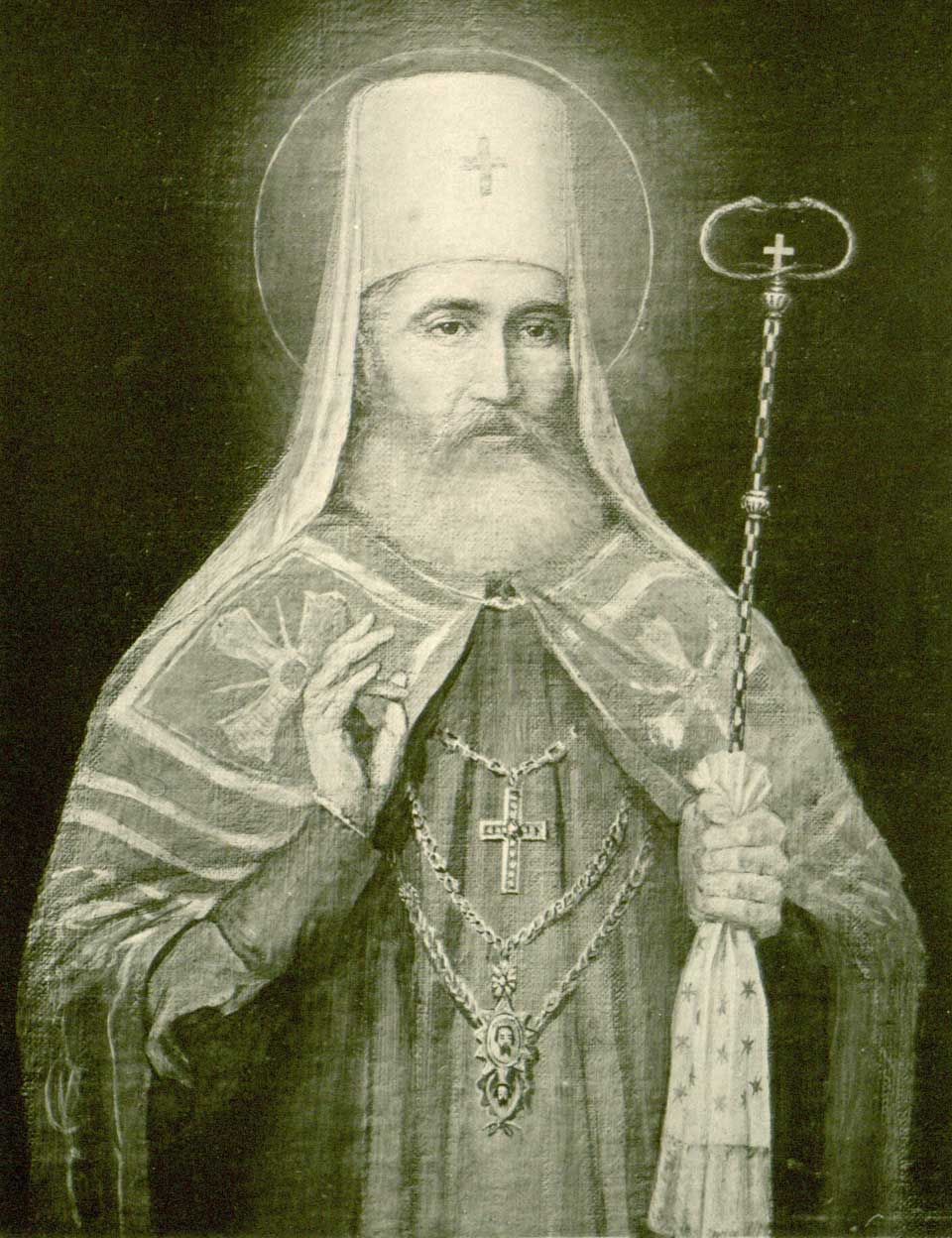
- Portrait by Andra Gavrilović, 1901
- Church: Eastern Orthodox Church
- Installed: 1784
- Term ended: 1830
- Predecessor: Arsenije Plamenac
- Successor: Petar II Petrović-Njegoš

Orders
- Ordination: 1784 by Mojsije Putnik

Personal details
- Born: 1748 Njeguši, Prince-Bishopric of Montenegro
- Died: 31 October 1830 (aged 81–82) Cetinje, Prince-Bishopric of Montenegro
- Denomination: Eastern Orthodoxy
- Residence: Cetinje
- Parents: Marko Petrović; Anđelija Martinović
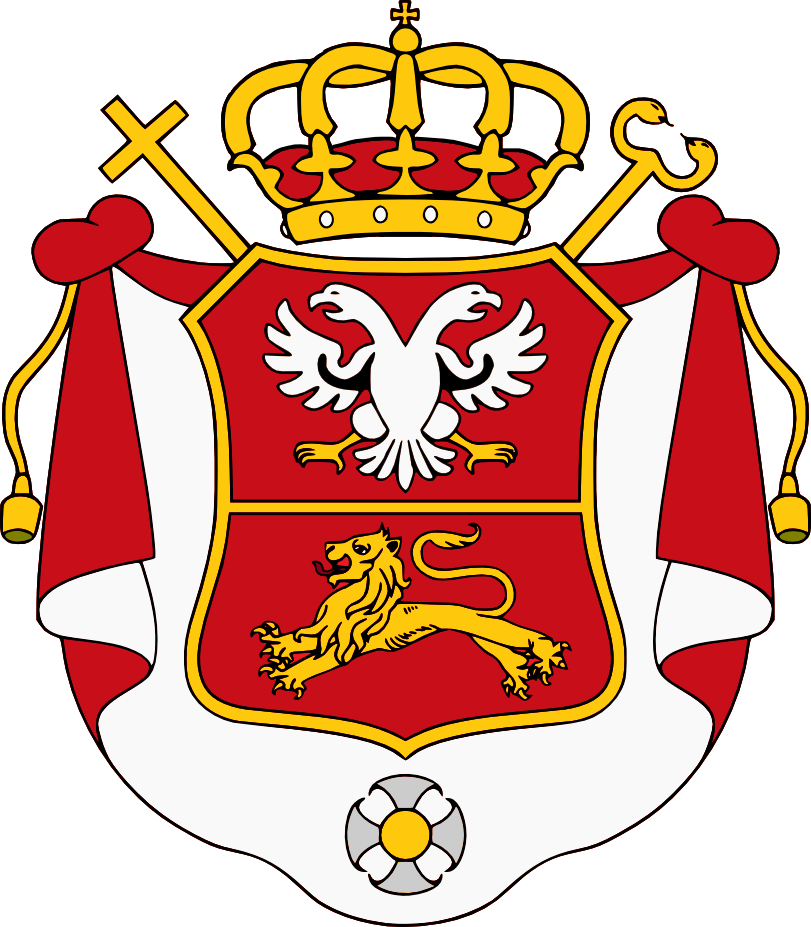
- Coat of arms: Petar I Petrović-Njegoš's coat of arms

Sainthood
- Feast day: October 31 (Gregorian calendar), October 18 (Julian calendar)
- Venerated in: Serbian Orthodox Church
- Title as Saint: Saint Peter of Cetinje
- Canonized: by Petar II Petrović Njegoš

Petar I Petrović-Njegoš (Serbian: Петар I Петровић Његош; 1748 – 31 October 1830) was the Prince-Bishop of Montenegro from 1784 to 1830 and Exarch (legate) of the Serbian Orthodox Church in Montenegro. He was the most popular spiritual and military leader from the Petrović dynasty. During his long rule, Petar strengthened the state by uniting the often quarreling tribes, consolidating his control over Montenegrin lands, introducing the first laws in Montenegro in 1798. His rule prepared Montenegro for the subsequent introduction of modern institutions of the state: taxes, schools and larger commercial enterprises. He was canonized by the Serbian Orthodox Church as Saint Peter of Cetinje (Serbian: Sveti Petar Cetinjski / Свети Петар Цетињски).

== Early life ==
The son of Marko and Anđelija (née Martinović), Petar followed the footsteps of his relatives, becoming a monk and a deacon. He spent four years in Imperial Russia, finishing the Military School (1765–69). In 1778, archimandrite Petar was in Russia with guvernadur Jovan Radonjić and serdar Ivan Petrović. Metropolitan Sava Petrović (s. 1735–1781), who died in 1781, chose his nephew and co-adjutor Arsenije Plamenac the successor, which was met with opposition from the Montenegrin tribes at the beginning, later switching in favour after Sava gained the support of Šćepan Mali, the false tsar and ruler of Montenegro. Plamenac was inactive and had little power, serving as metropolitan between 1781 and his death in 1784. The guvernadur family of Radonjić, which had Venetian support and then Austrian, increased their power and sought to push aside the Petrović metropolitans. The chieftains had suggested Petar the bishop seat already in 1783, and he was then sent to the Habsburg Monarchy to be ordained.

== Office ==
=== 1784–99 ===
Petar was made a bishop (ordained) by Mojsije Putnik of the Metropolitanate of Karlovci at Sremski Karlovci on 13 October 1784. He then returned to Vienna where he met Russian chancellor Potemkin, and also Russian general Zorić and Ragusan emigre Frano Dolci. Petar was, under unclear circumstances, kicked out of Saint Petersburg in November 1785. During his trip, Montenegro was threatened by Kara Mahmud Pasha, the Pasha of Scutari. Mahmud Pasha attacked in June 1785. The Montenegrin army of 8000 was reduced by 3,000 Crmničani, and they were followed by many more surrenders. Mahmud Pasha crossed Bjelice, and burnt down Njeguši, and received help from Nikšići, then crossed Paštrovići to return to Shkodër.

The Metropolitan Petar I and guvernadur Jovan Radonjić were the two head chiefs of Montenegro, one by title, the other according to actual position. Jovan sought to rule Montenegro by himself; he appropriated secular rights for himself and wanted the Metropolitan to exercise only his spiritual leadership; that the guvernadur was the master of the people and the Metropolitan the master of the church. The two clashed in international politics: the Metropolitan held to Russia, while Jovan relied on Austria. Hence, there were two parties in the land, one "Russophile" and the other "Austrophile", led by the Metropolitan and Jovan, respectively. On the question whether to support Austria or not, the two sides conflicted during the Austro-Turkish War (1787–91) and Russo-Turkish War (1787–92). During this period, Montenegro was divided into the following districts: Katunska nahija, Riječka nahija, Crmnička nahija, Lješanska nahija and Pješivačka nahija. These were governed by the officials, Jovan Radonjić and the Metropolitan, with the help of 5 serdars, 9 vojvodas and 34 knezes (a synthesis of secular and theocratic government which will cause strife and struggle for supremacy until 1832–33).

In July 1788, Jovan Radonjić asked Empress Catherine II of Russia to send Sofronije Jugović-Marković, whom he promised the throne of Montenegro; Jovan sought to bring him to the land and replace Petrović, then get rid of him too, securing the rule for himself. He sent another letter in 1789, then made a trip to Austria seeking to retrieve his reputation with the help of the Austrian court. Radonjić requested that the Austrian army be sent into Montenegro, which was declined. On Radonjić's re-request, the Austrian Emperor decided to send munition to Montenegro in February 1790, provided that the Montenegrins "come under the wings of the Emperor in war-time, as much as in peace-time, with the Ottoman Empire". Austrian support looked unpromising.

In 1794, the Kuči and Rovčani (tribes outside Montenegro) were devastated by the Ottomans. In 1796, Kara Mahmud Pasha was defeated at the Battle of Martinići. Mahmud Pasha later returned and was defeated and killed at the Battle of Krusi on 22 September. Half of the Montenegrin army was led by Metropolitan Petar I, the other by Jovan. Petar I's army was assisted by the Bjelopavlići and Piperi. Mahmud Pasha's army, allegedly made up of 30,000, including seven French officers, fought a Montenegrin force of 6,000, and had heavy casualties. The Montenegrin victory resulted in territorial expansion, with the tribes of Bjelopavlići and Piperi being joined into the Montenegrin state. The Rovčani, as other highlander tribes, subsequently turned more and more towards Montenegro.

The tribe of Njeguši to which the Petrović-Njegoš belonged was involved in one of the most long-standing blood feuds in Montenegro against the tribe of Ceklin in the 18th century. The feud lasted for 32 years and ended in 1797 in a joint meeting of all tribes of Old Montenegro under Petar Petrović. The pacification of the feud between two of the strongest tribes of the region is considered as an important step in Petar Petrović's strategy of uniting Old Montenegro.

Metropolitan Petar I sent letters in 1799 to the Moračani and Rovčani, advising them to live peacefully and in solidarity. In 1799, Montenegro was guaranteed a subsidy by Russia, which assured that it would defend its interest.

=== 1800–09 ===
During the First Serbian Uprising Petar I began cooperating with Karađorđe, the Serbian rebel leader. Petar I had by that time distinguished himself in international relations, as the bishop and ruler of Montenegro. It was known that Petar was ready to revolt as soon as a favourable opportunity came along. Russian ambassador in Vienna, Razumovski, informed Interior Minister Czartoryski of a secret message received on 13 December 1803 that Petar I had 2,000 armed men, and that he "had taken off his bishop clothes and dressed in military clothing, a general uniform" and that he planned to raise his army to 12,000 men. Knowing that his army would not be able to fight the stronger Ottomans, he sought to unite with the "rebels of Šumadija", and together, with the help of the Russian, turn on the Turks. He messaged Visoki Dečani of his intentions. Petar I was a pen pal of Dositej Obradović.

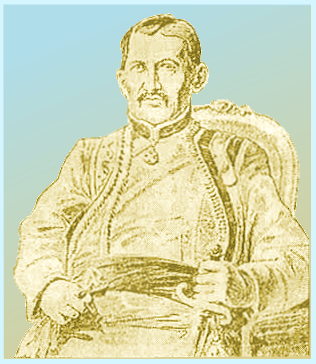
Petar I Petrović as a warrior (by French drawing)

In 1806, the troops of Napoleonic France advanced toward the Bay of Kotor in Montenegro. The Montenegrin army led by Petar I, aided by several Russian battalions and the fleet of Admiral Dmitry Senyavin pushed them back to Dubrovnik and put it under siege. But soon after, Russian Tsar Alexander I asked Montenegrins to relinquish control of Boka to Austria. However, after Montenegrins retreated to Herceg Novi, Alexander changed his mind again, and with a help of Montenegrins conquered Brač and Korčula. In the meantime, France encouraged Turkey to attack Russia, which withdrew its fleet from the Adriatic to defend the Ionian islands. The Treaty of Tilsit (1807) between Russia and France granted the control of the Bay of Kotor to France. In early 1807, Petar had plans to unite several Serb-inhabited regions into a renewed Serbian Empire. In February 1807, Petar I planned an invasion of Herzegovina and asked for Karađorđe's aid. After the Battle of Suvodol and Serbian rebel advance, Karađorđe managed connecting the rebel forces to Montenegro (1809). However, Karađorđe was unable to hold lasting ties with the Serbs of Montenegro and Bosnia and Herzegovina, as after 1809 the uprising waned.

=== 1810–20 ===
Petar I waged a successful campaign against the Bosnia Eyalet in 1819. In 1820, in the north of Montenegro, the highlanders from Morača led by serdar Mrkoje Mijušković won a major battle against the Ottoman Bosnian forces. The repulse of an Ottoman invasion from Albania during the Russo-Turkish War (1828–29) led to the recognition of Montenegrin sovereignty over Piperi. Petar I had managed to unite the Piperi and Bjelopavlići with Montenegro, and when Bjelopavlići and the rest of the Hills (Seven hills) were joined into the Montenegrin state, the polity was officially called "Black Mountain (Montenegro) and the Hills".

== Pan-Serbism ==
Petar I conceived a plan in 1807 to revive a Serbian Empire ("Slaveno–Serb empire"), which he informed the Russian court. Earlier, in June 1804, Habsburg Serb metropolitan Stefan Stratimirović informed the Russian court of the same plan. Petar I's plan was to unite Podgorica, Spuž, Žabljak, the Bay of Kotor, Bosnia, Herzegovina, Dubrovnik and Dalmatia with Montenegro. The title of Serbian emperor would be held by the Russian emperor. The French–Russian peace treaty thwarted the plan. After the French conquered Dalmatia, they offered Petar I the title of "Patriarch of all of the Serb nation or all Illyricum" under the condition that he stop cooperation with Russia and accept a French protectorate, which he declined, fearing eventual Papal jurisdiction. The Metropolitanate of Cetinje began exerting influence towards Brda and Old Herzegovina, which considered Montenegro as the leader for liberation. While his reputation and influence reached the surrounding lands, he increasingly directed himself to Revolutionary Serbia as the backbone for liberation and unification. The project is included in several historiographical works.

== Canonisation ==
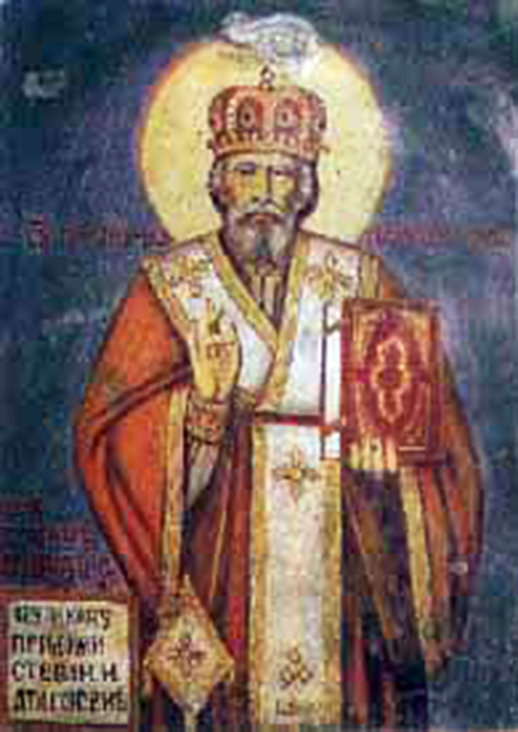
Orthodox icon of Petar as a saint.

He was canonised as Saint Peter of Cetinje by his successor Petar II Petrović-Njegoš. The Serbian Orthodox Church celebrate him on October 31, Gregorian calendar, which is October 18th in the Julian calendar.

== Works ==
- The Lore in Verse (Поучење у стиховима)
- The Sons of Ivan-bey (Синови Иванбегови)
- Poem to Karageorge (Пјесма Карађорђу)
- To Serb Christmas Eve (Српско Бадње вече)
- Short History of Montenegro (Кратка Историја Црнe Горe)

== Sources ==
- Bogunović, Nebojša. Iz srpske istorije. eBook Portal. pp. 71–74. GGKEY:TEEA3BSLU7B.
- Čubrilović, Vasa (1983). Odabrani istorijski radovi. Narodna knjiga.
- Вуксан Душан (1951). Петар I Петровић Његош и његово доба. Цетиње.
- Király, Béla K.; Rothenberg, Gunther E. (1982). War and Society in East Central Europe: The first Montenegrin uprising 1804-1813. Brooklyn College Press. ISBN 978-0-930888-15-2.
- Kostić, Lazo M. (2000). Његош и српство. Српска радикална странка. ISBN 978-86-7402-035-7.
- Miller, William (2012). The Ottoman Empire and Its Successors 1801-1927. Routledge. ISBN 978-1-136-26046-9.
- Milović, Jevto M. (1987). Petar I Petrović Njegoš: pisma i drugi dokumenti. Istorijski institut SR Crne Gore.
- Novak, Viktor (1949). Istoriski časopis. Vol. 1.
- Pavićević, Branko (2007). Petar I Petrović Njegoš. CID. ISBN 9788649503427.
- Stamatović, Aleksandar (1999). "Митрополија црногорска за вријеме митрополита Петровића". Кратка историја Митрополије Црногорско-приморске (1219-1999).
- Dragoslav Srejović; Slavko Gavrilović; Sima M. Ćirković (1981). Istorija srpskog naroda. Vol. 5. Srpska književna zadruga.
- Glasnik cetinjskih muzeja. Vol. 7–10. 1974.
- Stanojević, Gligor; Vasić, Milan (1975). Istorija Crne Gore (3): od početka XVI do kraja XVIII vijeka. Titograd: Redakcija za istoriju Crne Gore. OCLC 799489791.
- Srbsko Učeno Društvo (1891). Glasnik Srbskog učenog društva. Vol. 72. u Državnoj štampariji.

Religious titles
Preceded by Arsenije Plamenac	Metropolitan of Montenegro and the Hills; 1784–1830	Succeeded by Petar II
