= Donji Brčeli Monastery =

Serbian Orthodox monastery near Cetinje, Montenegro

Coordinates: 42°14′50.1″N 19°0′32.8″E

Monastery of St. Nicholas, Brčeli
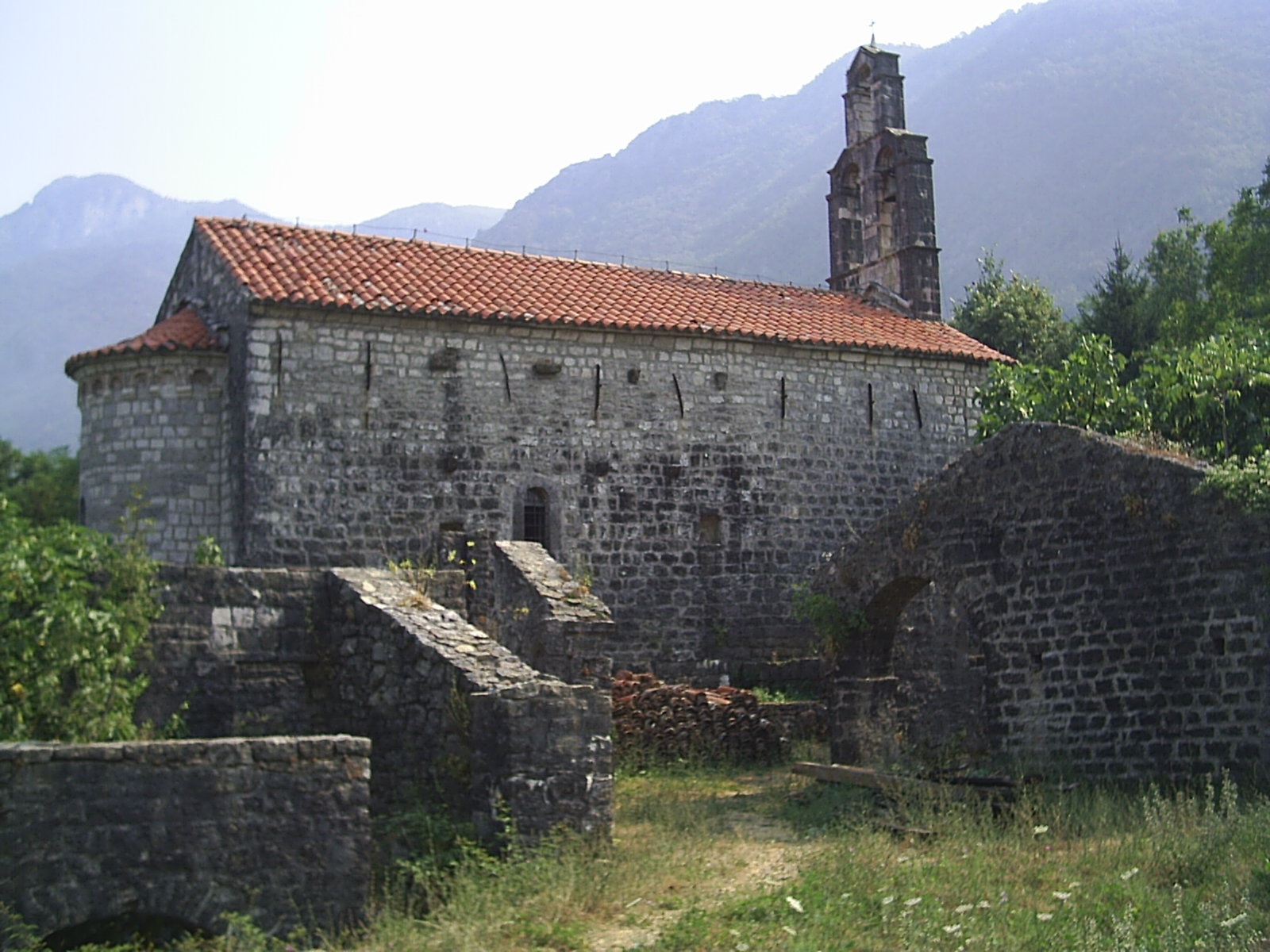

- Location within Montenegro

Religion
- Affiliation: Serbian Orthodox Church
- Rite: Byzantine Rite
- Year consecrated: 15th century
- Status: active

Location
- Location: Virpazar, Montenegro
- Interactive map of Monastery of St. Nicholas, Brčeli
- Territory: Metropolitanate of Montenegro and the Littoral

Architecture
- Founder: Jelena Balšić (1365–1443)
- Funded by: Jelena Balšić
- Completed: before 1443

The Donji Brčeli Monastery (Serbian: Манастир Доњи Брчели, romanized: Manastir Donji Brčeli), also known as Donje Brčele (Доње Брчеле), or simply Brčeli (Брчели), is a Serbian Orthodox monastery located near the village of Virpazar, Montenegro. It was founded by Jelena Balšić (1365–1443), the daughter of Prince Lazar of Serbia. Šćepan Mali, the impostor pretender of the Russian emperor, was buried here.

== History ==
It was founded by Jelena Lazarević (1365–1443), daughter of Prince Lazar of Serbia and wife of Zetan lord Đurađ II. The village of Brčele had earlier been granted by King Stefan Dečanski (r. 1321–31) to the Monastery of St. Nicholas on the Vranjina island.

In 1714, the Ottomans burned down the Bigovo Monastery in the Bay of Kotor, so the hegumen and monks found shelter in the Brčeli Monastery. Šćepan Mali, the impostor pretender of Russian Tsar Peter III, who managed to rule Montenegro from 1767 until his death in 1773, was buried in the monastery. Petar II Petrović-Njegoš sent Bishop Nikifor of Užice to Brčeli upon his arrival at Morača from the Principality of Serbia.

In 1861, the monastery was reconstructed by Prince Nikola I Petrović of Montenegro.

== See also ==
- List of Serbian monasteries

== Sources ==
- Džomić, Velibor V. (2006). Pravoslavlje u Crnoj Gori. ISBN 9788676600311.
