= Battle of Krusi =

1796 battle of the Montenegrin-Ottoman Wars

Battle of Krusi Beteja e Krusit
Date	3 October 1796
Location	Krusi, Lješanska nahija (modern-day Montenegro)
Result	Decisive Montenegrin victory

Belligerents
Montenegro	Ottoman Empire: Pashalik of Scutari

Commanders and leaders
Petar I Petrović Njegoš; Jovan Radonjić	(Ottoman Empire) Kara Mahmud Pasha †

Units involved
Montenegro	Unknown

Strength
6,500 men	23,000 men

Casualties and losses
132 dead, 237 wounded	7,000 Ottomans dead

The Battle of Krusi (Albanian: Beteja e Krusit; Serbian: Битка на Крусима, romanized: Bitka na Krusima) was fought on 3 October [O.S. 22 September] 1796 between the campaigning army of Ottoman Empire commanded by Kara Mahmud Pasha, the Pasha of Scutari, and tribes of Prince-Bishopric of Montenegro under the command of Metropolitan Petar I Petrović Njegoš and Jovan Radonjić, at Krusi, Lješanska nahija.

== Prelude ==
After Kara Mahmud Pasha was defeated at Martinići (1796), he planned new operations to subdue the Prince-Bishopric of Montenegro. With his main army in Scutari, Kara Mahmud Pasha advanced to Podgorica. In the meantime, near the Montenegrin borders, a rather large number of forces were stationed due to the concentration of attacks towards Montenegro and Brda. From Podgorica, the Pasha's forces moved onto Lješkopolje because his goal was to use the Lješkopolje-Krusi-Carev laz-Rijeka Crnojevića line to his advantage in order to carry out a raid towards Cetinje.

Petar I was informed of the Pasha's plans, and had managed to organize a defence. He took the larger part of his army and camped beneath the Sađavce mountain on the right bank of the Matica river. Another large unit under the command of Jovan Radonjić camped under the Busovnika mountain near the village of Krusi. One of the early accounts of the battle authored by Archimandrite Stefan Vukčević in 1811.

== Battle ==
The battle occurred on 3 October 1796 when Pasha ordered his troops to cross the right hand bank of the Sitnica River and attack Montenegrin positions. Krusi was directly in the path of his army.

Half of the Montenegrin army was led by Metropolitan Petar I, and the other half by Jovan Radonjić.

The earliest historical sources about this battle include records of Russian deacon Aleksije, at that time the scribe of Petar I. Aleksije wrote that both Petar I and Radonjić were armed and wore uniforms and that 500 chosen soldiers also wore uniforms. According to deakon Aleksije, the battle started at 8:30 am and lasted until evening. After a whole day of fighting, the Montenegrins were able to defeat the Ottoman army. Pasha was killed by the Montenegrin army during the battle. Legend has it that it was a Bogdan Nikolić from Zalazi who managed to kill Bushati. Before Kara Mahmud was killed and decapitated in battle, it is said that he single-handedly slew 32 Montenegrins during his last stand while being surrounded by Montenegrin soldiers. The remains of the defeated Ottoman army were forced to withdraw to Podgorica. According to voivode Mirko, the Ottomans had 7,000 killed men. Vučetić presents a figure of 32 dead and 64 wounded Montenegrin soldiers. Deakon Arsenije presents the probably more realistic figures of 132 dead and 237 wounded Montenegrin soldiers.

== Aftermath ==
The first report about the victory of Montenegrins was written by Metropolitan Petar I to Ivan Osterman, the Chancellor of the Russian Empire. In that report Petar I expressed his gratitude for the support of Russia and its empress, proudly stating that his forces had killed the Scutari governor and captured 33 Ottoman flags, large numbers of light weapons and plenty of ammunition.

The independence of Montenegro, though not officially internationally recognized emerged from the victory in this battle, which allowed the proclamation of the first constitutional act of Montenegro - The General Code of Montenegro and the Highlands (Serbian: Законик црногорски и брдски).

The Ottoman defeat at Battle of Krusi weakened the Ottoman rule in the region. On the other hand, it prevented the secession of Albania from the Ottoman Empire, reducing it to simple renegade actions.

== See also ==
- Battle of Martinići
- Battle of Lopate

== Sources ==
- Rudić, Srđan; Pavlović, Lela (1 September 2016). Srpska revolucija i obnova državnosti Srbije: Dvesta godina od Drugog srpskog ustanka: =Serbian Revolution and Renewal of Serbian Statehood : Two Hundred Years since the Second Serbian Uprising. Istorijski institut, Beograd; Međuopštinski istorijski arhiv, Čačak. ISBN 978-86-7743-116-7.
- Petrović, Rastislav V. (1981). Pleme Kuči 1684–1796 (in Serbian). Belgrade: Narodna knjiga. p. 315.
- Veljković, Vidimir (2001). Politički moral Srba. Prosveta. ISBN 9788674555088.
- Pavićević, Branko (1990). Danilo I Petrović Njegoš, knjaz crnogorski i brdski, 1851-1860. Književne novine. ISBN 9788639102029.
- Jovanović, Jagoš (1995). Istorija Crne Gore. CID.
- Slijepčević, Đoko M. (1983). Srpsko-arbanaški odnosi kroz vekove sa posebnim osvrtom na novije vreme. D. Slijepčević.
- Pavićević, Branko (1996). Boj Crnogoraca i Brđana s Mahmut pašom 1796: zbornik radova o bitkama na Martinićima i Krusima. Svetigora.
- Novak, Viktor (1949). Istoriski časopis. Vol. 1.
