= Arsenije Plamenac =

Metropolitan of Montenegro

- Metropolitan of Cetinje
- Church: Serbian Orthodox
- Metropolis: Metropolitanate of Cetinje
- See: Cetinje
- Installed: 1781
- Term ended: 1784
- Predecessor: Sava Petrović Njegoš
- Successor: Petar I Petrović Njegoš
- Previous posts: monastery head (hegumen), bishop (episkop)

Orders
- Ordination: 1767 by Vasilije Brkić

Personal details
- Born: Unknown Crmnica (modern Montenegro)
- Died: 1784
- Denomination: Eastern Orthodoxy
- Residence: Cetinje
- Parents: Raič Plamenac and a Petrović

Arsenije Plamenac (Serbian Cyrillic: Арсеније Пламенац; fl. 1766 – 1784) was the Metropolitan of Cetinje between 1781 and 1784, earlier the co-adjutor to Metropolitan Sava Petrović during the reign of Šćepan Mali (1767–73). Plamenac (Plamenać) was from Crmnica, and belonged to the tribe's most notable brotherhood, the Plamenac. His father, Raič, was a priest. His maternal uncle was Sava Petrović. Following the footsteps of his father, and being the nephew of Sava, he quickly elevated through the monastic ranks, becoming a hegumen before his ordination. Sava intended to appoint him his successor in 1766, but was met with opposition from the Montenegrin tribes. The tribes accepted Arsenije after Sava had gained the support of Šćepan Mali, an impostor of Peter III of Russia who sought to rule Montenegro. Šćepan Mali supported Plamenac because he felt at home in Crmnica, and believed he would more easily take control of the whole of Montenegro by the side of Plamenac than the Petrović. Vasilije Brkić, the Patriarch of Peć, who had fled to Montenegro, consecrated Plamenac as a bishop in 1767. After his death, he was succeeded by Petar I Petrović Njegoš.

== Sources ==
- Kostić, Lazo M. (2000). Његош и српство. Српска радикална странка. ISBN 978-86-7402-035-7.
- Džomić, Velibor V. (2006). Pravoslavlje u Crnoj Gori. Svetigora. ISBN 9788676600311.
- Bishop Sava of Šumadija (1996). Srpski jerarsi: od devetog do dvadesetog veka. Evro. pp. 35–.

Religious titles
Preceded by Sava Petrović Njegoš	Metropolitan of Cetinje; 1781–1784	Succeeded by Petar I Petrović Njegoš
