= Battle of Martinići (1796) =

1796 battle of the Montenegrin-Ottoman Wars

Battle of Martinići Beteja e Martinicit
Date	2–11 July 1796
Location	Martinići, near Spuž, Montenegro
Result	Montenegrin victory
Territorial changes	Piperi and Bjelopavlići tribal regions united with Montenegro

Belligerents
Montenegro; Piperi; Bjelopavlići	Pashalik of Scutari

Commanders and leaders
Petar I Petrović-Njegoš; Jovan Radonjić	Kara Mahmud Pasha

Strength
3,000	5,000

The Battle of Martinići (Albanian: Beteja e Martinicit) was fought between Montenegro and the Pashalik of Scutari. It took place on the outskirts of the village Martinići, near Spuž in Montenegro.

Following the unification of Montenegro with Brda, the Ottoman governor of the Pashalik of Scutari launched a military offensive onto Montenegrin territory. Two Montenegrin divisions, led by Prince-bishop Petar I Petrović-Njegoš and guvernadur Jovan Radonjić, containing 3,000 men, took positions near Martinići. The Shkodran Army numbering 15,000 soldiers invaded Montenegro and was divided into three parts, and with about 5,000 soldiers Kara Mahmud advanced towards Martinići from Spuž, meanwhile the other two armies under Mehmed Pasha Bushati and Osman Pasha Nikshić marched towards Cetinje. Kara Mahmud fought the guerrilla resistance for nine days, before launching an assault on the Montenegrin positions on 11 July. The Montenegrins counter-attacked and the Shkodran Army suffered significant casualties and Kara Mahmud was wounded in Battle.

The result of this victory was the unification of the Piperi and Bjelopavlići clan regions, previously occupied by the Ottoman Empire, with Montenegro.

== See also ==
- Battle of Krusi
- Battle of Lopate

== Bibliography ==
- Pavićević, Branko, O prvom pohodu Mahmuta Bušatlije na Crnu Goru, Istoriski časopis, Belgrade, 1956, pp. 153–167.
- Vojna Enciklopedija, Belgrade, 1973, knjiga peta, pp. 316.
