= Šćepan Mali =

Tsar of Montenegro from 1768 to 1773

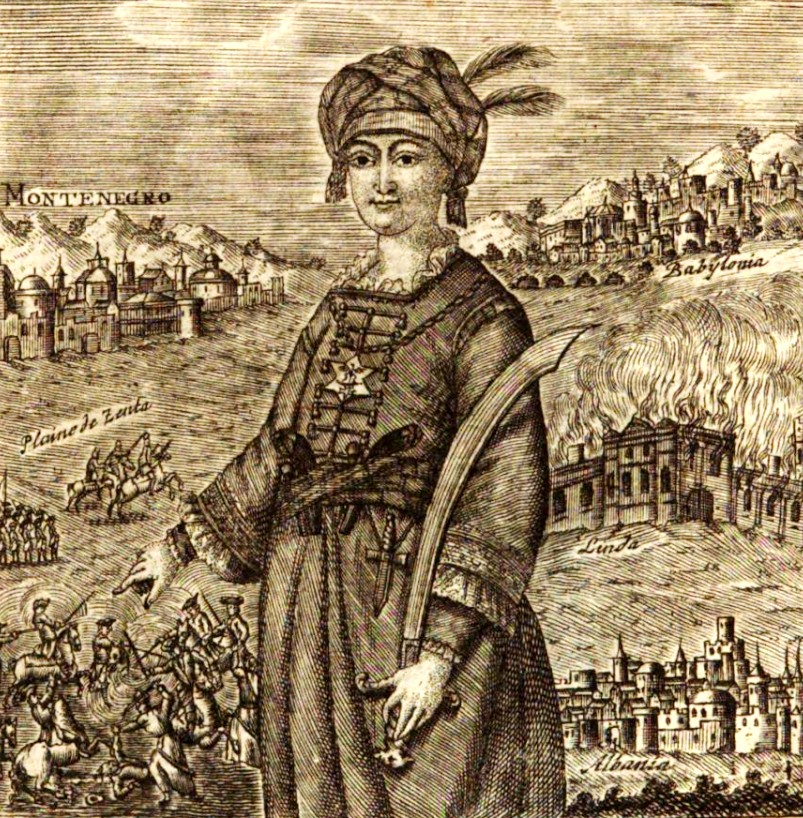
- Šćepan Mali as depicted in Stefano Zannowich's 1784 biography of his life

Tsar of Montenegro
- Reign: February 1768 – 22 September 1773
- Predecessor: Sava and Vasilije Petrović (Prince-Bishops)
- Successor: Sava Petrović (Prince-Bishop)
- Born: c. 1739; Dalmatia (?)
- Died: 22 September 1773 (aged c. 34); Donji Brčeli Monastery
- Religion: Serbian Orthodox

Šćepan Mali (Serbian Cyrillic: Шћепан Мали pronounced [ɕt͡ɕɛ̂paːn mâːli]; c. 1739 – 22 September 1773), translated as Stephen the Little, (Note: Alternatively Stephen the Small or Stephen the Humble.) was the first and only "tsar" of Montenegro, ruling the country as an absolute monarch from 1768 until his death. Of unclear origins, Šćepan became the ruler of Montenegro through a rumour that he was in fact the deposed Russian emperor Peter III, who had died several years before Šćepan surfaced in the Balkans.

Šćepan arrived in Montenegro in the autumn of 1766. Whether Šćepan was his real name is unknown, as is the reason for the epithet Mali. Who started the rumour that Šćepan was Peter and why is also unclear. Šćepan himself never formally proclaimed himself to be Peter, but never denied it either. Throughout 1767, he offered vague hints that he was the dead emperor, and as time went on, most of Montenegro became convinced of his supposed identity. Although Montenegro's legitimate ruler, Prince-Bishop Sava, who had met the real Peter and had received word from the Russian ambassador in Constantinople that Peter was dead, attempted to expose Šćepan, most Montenegrins continued to believe the rumours. In 1767, Šćepan was proclaimed as the country's ruler, and in February 1768, Sava was sidelined and confined to his monastery. Šćepan subsequently assumed the powers of an absolute monarch.

Šćepan's reign proved to be a surprisingly successful one. He managed to unite Montenegro's infighting clans for the first time in the country's history. Social, administrative and religious reforms laid the groundwork for Montenegro's transition into a true state. The sudden appearance of a "Russian emperor" in the Balkans was a cause for concern in Europe. Many wondered who Šćepan was, why he was impersonating Peter and what his intentions were. The Ottomans feared the development, but failed in an attempted invasion of Montenegro in 1768. Peter's widow and successor, Catherine the Great, engaged in numerous failed attempts to end Šćepan's rule. A Russian delegation finally arrived in Montenegro in 1769, exposed Šćepan as a fraud and briefly imprisoned him, but released him and returned him to power upon realising that he was the most competent of Montenegro's potential rulers. Though disappointed by the revelation that Šćepan was not Peter, the Montenegrins nevertheless welcomed his continued rule as he was now supported by Russia and there were few other good choices available. In 1771, Šćepan was injured in an accident involving a land mine. From that point until the end of his life, he was carried around in a sedan chair. During the last few years of his reign, Šćepan legislated numerous reforms, creating a court of Montenegrin clan leaders to dispense justice, introducing the death penalty and strengthening the central government. He ruled until he was murdered by one of his servants, bribed by the Ottomans, in September 1773.

Šćepan's legacy survives in the cultural memory of modern Montenegro and the surrounding countries. He is paradoxically remembered as both an ideal ruler and a fraud. Several stories and biographies have been written about him, alongside two theatre plays and two feature films. The film Lažni car ("The Fake Tsar"), released in 1955 and based on Šćepan's life, was the first ever Montenegrin feature film.

== Background ==
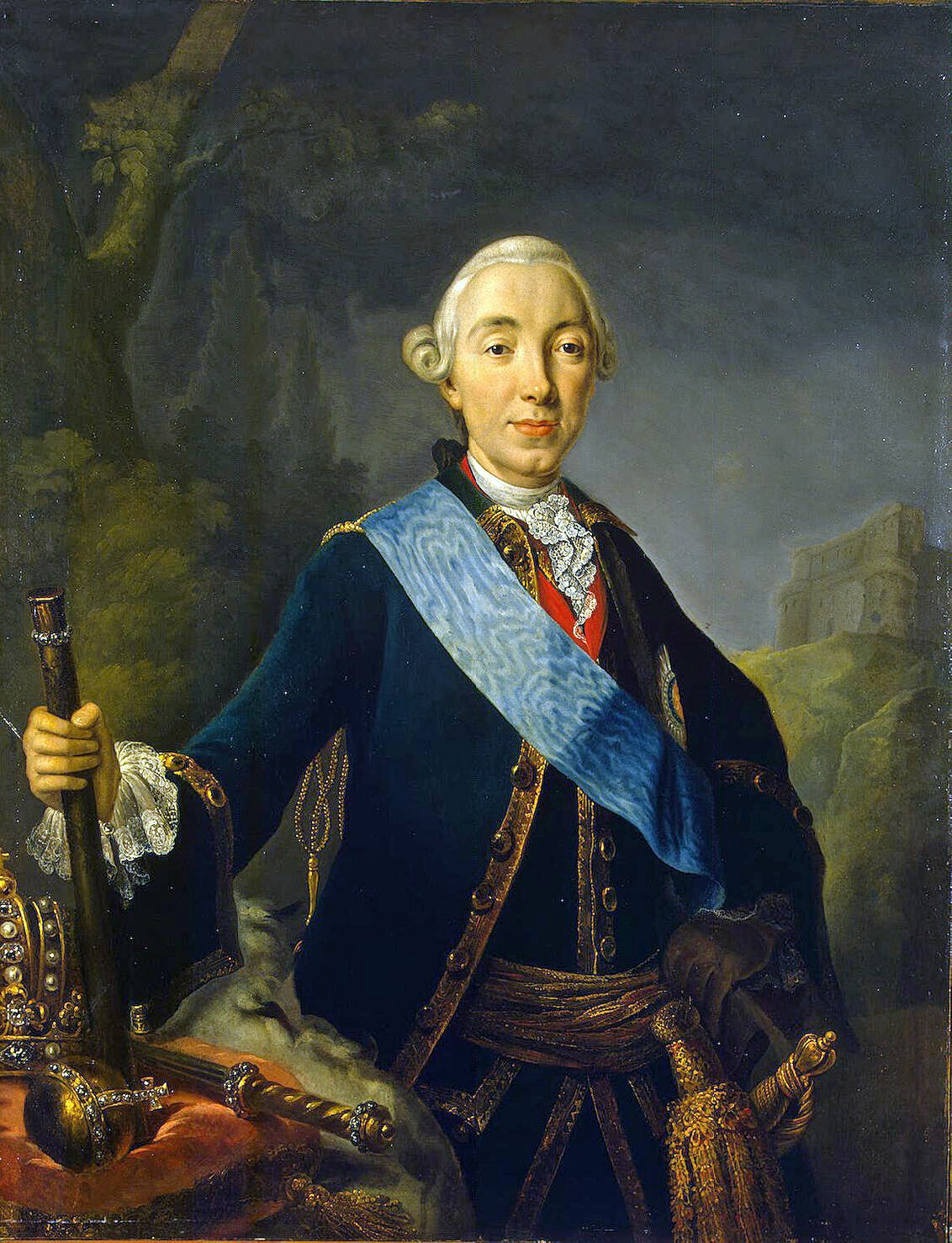
1761 portrait of Peter III of Russia

Peter III of Russia briefly ruled the Russian Empire between 5 January and 9 July 1762, and died shortly after abdicating, probably killed in a plot orchestrated by his wife and successor Catherine the Great. For years thereafter, rumours circulated in Russia and elsewhere that the Tsar was not dead and that he had escaped into exile. These rumours led to numerous people claiming to be Peter, such as the ataman Yemelyan Pugachev, who led an ill-fated rebellion in the mid-1770s seeking to depose Catherine and seize power for himself.

At this time, the Prince-Bishopric of Montenegro, though independent, was more or less subjected to the Ottoman Empire. Since the Ottomans had a relatively weak central government, the Montenegrins occasionally fought against them. As a small mountain realm, Montenegro remained one of the few more or less independent Orthodox Christian areas in the Balkans, and the Ottomans remained a constant threat to their continued existence. On the Adriatic coast, Montenegro was also bordered by the Republic of Venice, which was slowly losing its grasp over the region. Montenegro's predicament was compounded by frequent infighting and the lack of authority enjoyed by the ruling Prince-Bishop, Sava. The Montenegrins had little respect for Sava, who was an idle ruler. Though he had once co-ruled with his more respected and competent cousin, Vasilije, the latter died on 10 March 1766, leaving the country more or less leaderless. There was no real state in Montenegro at the time, with the country rather being more akin to a conglomerate of autonomous and semi-nomadic clans precariously united because of external danger. Šćepan Mali's subsequent success partly built on the widespread Montenegrin belief and hope for a saviour figure.

Šćepan's true identity is unknown, though it is certain that he was not Russian. Though he used the name Šćepan himself, there is little reason to believe that this was his real name. It is possible that the choice of this name came from its etymology (Stephanos means "crown" in Greek) or that it derived from the practice of the medieval Serbian rulers (such as Emperor Stefan Dušan) to typically use the name Stefan in conjunction with their own given names. The epithet Mali (small, little or humble), which Šćepan used himself, is also of unclear origin.

One recent theory, first advocated independently by Rastislav Petrović (2001) and Dušan J. Martinović (2002), is that Šćepan was Jovan Stefanović Baljević, otherwise remembered for being the first Montenegrin to defend a doctoral dissertation. Baljević spent several years working in Hungary—earning money by, among other things, forging passports—and later served as an officer in the Imperial Russian Army. Though traditionally believed to have died in 1769, Petrović and Martinović have presented evidence that Baljević disappeared several years before 1769 and travelled to Montenegro. Even if this identification was proved to be correct, it would not completely solve the mystery since Baljević's subsequent motivations would still remain unknown.

== Rise to power ==
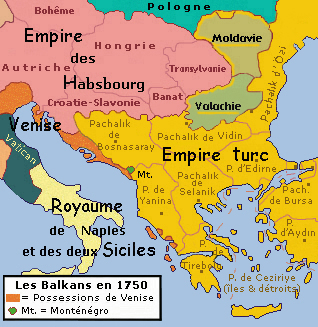
Approximate political map of the Balkans c. 1750, Montenegro, the small country marked with green at the centre of the map, was surrounded by the Ottoman Empire to the east and the Republic of Venice to the west

The earliest record of Šćepan is his arrival in the village of Maine in the autumn of 1766. Maine, which is located in modern-day Montenegro, was controlled by the Venetians at the time. At Maine, Šćepan served as a physician, and appears to have been popular among the locals. A group of prominent citizens, among them monks, soon expressed support for Šćepan and started a rumour that he was Peter III, who they claimed had gone into exile. How this rumour originated, who exactly was behind it and why it was created in the first place is unclear. By August 1767, the rumour had become widespread among the Montenegrins, though Šćepan himself did not formally proclaim himself to be Peter. The rumour was instead reinforced by the air of mystery surrounding Šćepan and several ambiguous statements he made to those around him.

While in church during prayers for the Russian imperial family, it was said that Šćepan shed tears and turned to face the wall in sorrow at the mention of Peter's son, Paul. At one point, Šćepan wept upon seeing a portrait of Peter in Maine's Orthodox monastery. Many of his supporters would later say they saw a distinct likeness between the portrait and Šćepan. Prominent Montenegrins who had visited Russia also reinforced the idea by swearing that Šćepan was none other than Peter. Desperation due to the lack of leadership and a fanatical admiration for Russia among many Montenegrins led to Šćepan becoming an increasingly prominent figure.

As these rumours circulated, Šćepan issued a proclamation to the people of Montenegro, urging them to end their internecine feuds, to adhere to their Orthodox Christian ideals, to prepare for war against external enemies and to expect bountiful rewards. He refused to confirm or deny if he was Peter, and signed documents with "Šćepan Mali, the smallest on Earth, and good unto the good". In response to the proclamation, a gathering of Montenegrin chiefs and lords met at Cetinje, Montenegro's capital, on 3 October 1767, and agreed to stop all the feuds between the clans of Montenegro, but only until 23 April the next year (Saint George's Day). Šćepan considered this armistice unacceptable and tore up the message sent by the gathering of nobles, stamped on it and demanded that they instead swear to uphold peace between each other in perpetuity. Šćepan's display of royal displeasure convinced the people of Montenegro even more that he was Peter. The excitement amongst the Montenegrins was so palpable that Prince-Bishop Sava was initially convinced of Šćepan's claims, despite having once met the real Peter.

On 17 October, the chiefs and lords of Montenegro gathered again on the plains outside Cetinje. A monk read out Šćepan's commands to a crowd of perhaps 400 nobles and soldiers, whereupon they agreed to uphold the perpetual peace. The majority of Montenegrins now believed that Šćepan was Peter and their clan chieftains went to Maine, although it was still in Venetian territory, and paid homage to him. On 2 November, the Montenegrins issued a charter officially recognising Šćepan as Peter.

In early February 1768, Prince-Bishop Sava received word from the Russian ambassador to Constantinople that Šćepan was an impostor. Armed with the letter, Sava attempted to convince the people of the truth, but the Montenegrins preferred the hopeful rumour to the more distressing reality. Sava was stripped of his possessions and secular power and locked up within his own monastery. Šćepan also pillaged the Prince-Bishop's property in revenge.

Šćepan had effectively been proclaimed Montenegro's ruler in 1767. With the Prince-Bishop pushed aside, Šćepan established himself as Montenegro's absolute ruler in February 1768, becoming the country's first and only "tsar". In April, he moved his residence to Montenegrin territory and began living there permanently. The sole factor which had lent him authority and the love of the people in the first place was the widespread belief that he was Peter. Without ever openly confirming or denying the truth of this claim, Šćepan had managed to seize power in Montenegro, unite the people and depose the country's legitimate ruler, all in the space of a few months. The belief that Peter III of Russia had honoured Montenegro with his presence nourished hopes that Montenegro and Russia would soon join together and liberate the Orthodox Christians of the Balkans from Ottoman rule.

== Rule in Montenegro ==
Banner of Montenegro adopted during the reign of Šćepan Mali

During Šćepan's brief reign, the usual infighting among the Montenegrin clans subsided. The result was a level of peace and unity that had never existed before. Šćepan respected the rights of local chiefs, who maintained order, and introduced some socio-political reforms, notably separating religious and secular power and thus undermining the priesthood's traditional claim to authority. The news of the arrival of a "Russian emperor" in Montenegro gained the country more attention across Europe. In many places, Šćepan's ascent was the cause of great concern and political turmoil. In some of the lands bordering Montenegro, vassals of the Venetians and the Ottomans stopped paying tribute to their overlords, which caused the Ottomans to fear a full-scale revolt. Montenegrin soldiers also began raiding Ottoman and Venetian territory. Šćepan's true identity was a topic of discussion throughout Europe. Although they all agreed that Šćepan was an impostor, numerous officials and diplomats in Vienna, the capital of the Habsburg monarchy, speculated as to Šćepan's true identity, and wondered what his intentions were and who benefited from his sudden rise to power.

The first written descriptions of a flag of Montenegro comes from the reign of Šćepan. The banner used by the Montenegrins in his time was white within a red frame with a golden cross on the top of the flag pole.

=== Russian reaction ===
1780s portrait of Catherine the Great, Empress of Russia

The Russian ambassador in Constantinople, Alexis Obreskov, had first learnt of Šćepan while speaking with the Venetian bailo of Constantinople, Rosini, on 16 November 1767, but had then deemed the matter as being of little importance. On 17 November, the very next day, Obreskov received word from Prince-Bishop Sava, who was unsure whether Šćepan was Peter III or not and feared the wrath of Catherine the Great in either case. Sava implored Obreskov to tell him "whether Peter III is dead or alive, for if he is alive, then he is verily in Montenegro". Obreskov replied the same day, writing: "I reply that the Emperor of All the Russias, Peter III, passed away on July 6, 1762, and was solemnly interred with all honours in the cathedral church of the Monastery of St. Alexander Nevskij by the side of his grandfather, the Emperor Peter the Great of blessed and ever glorious memory". Annoyed with Sava's suggestion that Peter III could be alive in Montenegro, Obreskov added that "I am astonished that Your Eminence has not been informed of this till now, and that you, together with your unenlightened people, could have so fallen into error as to believe this impostor and vagabond". The ambassador advised Sava to immediately expose Šćepan as a fraud and drive him from Montenegro, otherwise the country might lose Russia's favour. As previously described, Sava's attempts to follow this advice only ended with Šćepan's rise to power.

Obreskov reported on Šćepan to the Russian court on 10 December 1767. He implored Empress Catherine to inform him if she received any reports of Šćepan entering Ottoman territory, and to send him instructions on what to do if this were to happen. Šćepan also decided to inform the Russian court of his existence himself. He probably knew of Sava's correspondence with Obreskov and might have wished to end the Prince-Bishop's attempts at discrediting him. As someone believed to be Peter III, it also increased his prestige to send emissaries to Russia. In December 1767 and January 1768, four emissaries were sent to the Russian Embassy in Vienna. The emissaries were all detained at the Austrian border and the Russian Embassy did not hear from them until February, when desperate letters from two of them, Grigorije Drekalović and Archimandrite Avakum Milaković, reached Vienna. The Russian ambassador in Vienna, Prince Dmitry Golitsyn, wrote to Catherine on 20 February, saying: "Not content with his wondrous revelation unto his own unenlightened and stupid people, this Montenegrin messiah, who is known by the name of Peter the Third, has resolved to glorify himself throughout all the universe through his apostles", concluding that the letters sent to him by the Montenegrin emissaries were "worthy of complete contempt".

Catherine herself was alarmed by the news. She immediately sent an order to the commanders of frontier towns along Russia's entire western border, reading: "It is possible that the pretender may send similar emissaries into Russia, and that perhaps he may be tempted to enter our borders". Border officials in Smolensk, Riga, Reval, Vyborg, Kiev and Novorossiysk were ordered to detain all suspicious travelers, particularly if these travelers were from Montenegro. The councilor of the Russian Embassy in Vienna, George Merk, was instructed to immediately travel to Montenegro via Venice, with a letter from Catherine to the nobles of Montenegro to prove that Peter III was dead. The letter also threatened that if Šćepan was not exposed and deposed, Russia would end its subsidies to Montenegro and perhaps invade and destroy the country. Merck left Vienna on 2 April 1768, but the Venetians refused to let him travel through their territory, fearing the ire of the Ottomans. After lengthy negotiations, Merck was allowed passage to Kotor but soon found that a Venetian blockade prevented him from crossing into Montenegro, and prevented the nobles of Montenegro from meeting him. He made an attempt to cross into Montenegro through the city of Ragusa, but Ragusa did not let him past the town gate and Merck gave up, returning to Vienna in early August. His failure made Catherine furious, and he was immediately dismissed from his position.

Another attempt was made by sending Avakum Milakovic, one of Šćepan's emissaries, whom the Russians had convinced of Šćepan's fraud, to the Montenegrins. Having learned of the fraud, Milaković had agreed on his own accord to return to Montenegro and reveal the truth. Though the Russians asked him, Milakovic could not reveal Šćepan's true identity himself since he did not know it. Disguised as a Greek merchant, Milaković left Vienna on 13 August 1768 but he too proved unable to get through the Venetian blockade and he learned that Montenegro was at war with the Ottoman Empire. Like Merck before him, Milaković returned to Vienna unsuccessful.

=== Attempted Ottoman invasion ===
The false Tsar proved difficult to get rid of. The Venetians had unsuccessfully attempted to poison him as early as 1767. The Ottomans were highly concerned by the developments in Montenegro, believing that Šćepan had been placed in Montenegro by the Russians. In August 1768, they thus prepared to invade Montenegro to put an end to his rule. The Ottomans assembled an army of 50,000 soldiers and invaded Montenegro from three different directions. At the same time, the Montenegrin coast was blockaded by the Venetians, meaning that the country was effectively surrounded by enemies.

Šćepan himself appears to have momentarily fled his responsibilities due to the prospect of the Ottoman invasion. The Montenegrin clans, united due to Šćepan's rule, managed to rally together an army of perhaps as many as 10,000 soldiers to defend their homeland. Miraculously, the outnumbered and quickly assembled Montenegrin force won the initial battle against the Ottoman invaders. Soon afterwards, there was heavy rain, which soaked the gunpowder brought by the Ottomans, weakening the invading forces. Furthermore, Russia had just declared war on the Ottoman Empire, which forced the Ottomans to sign a ceasefire with the Montenegrins.

=== Dolgorukov's mission to Montenegro ===
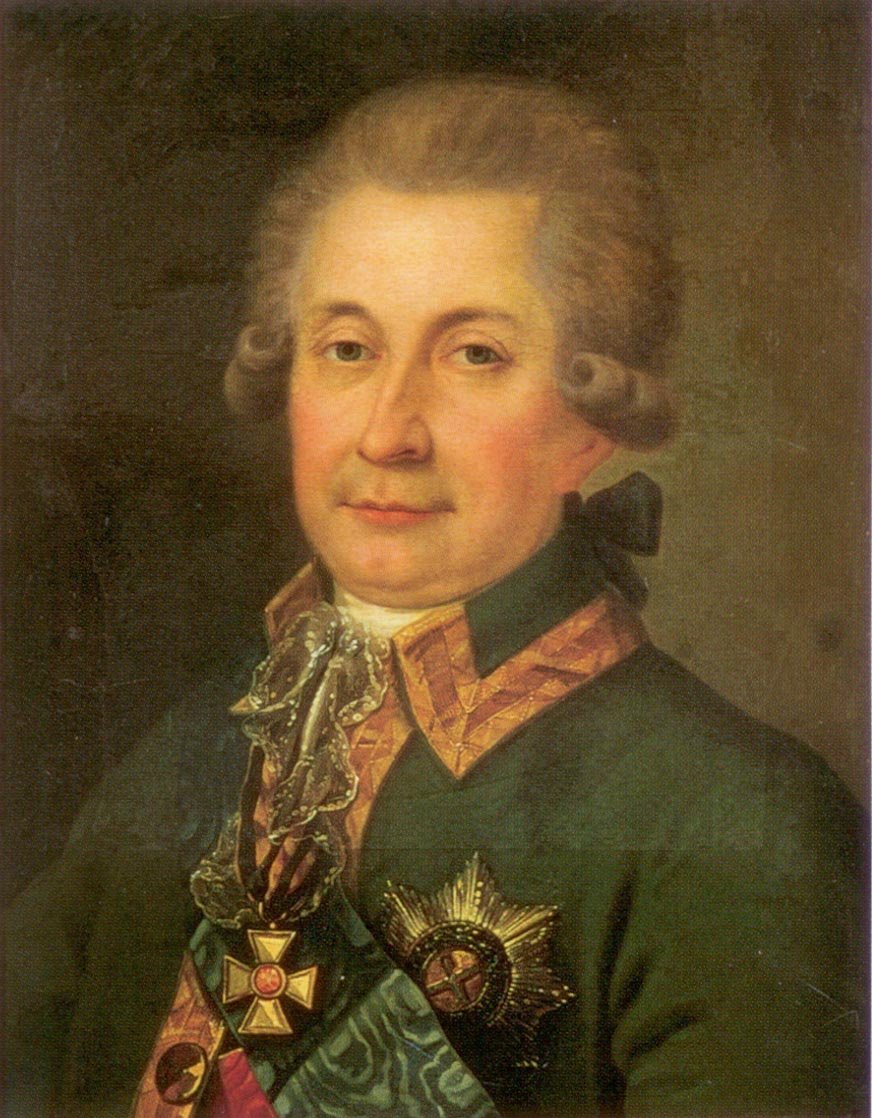
1780s portrait of Yuri Vladimirovich Dolgorukov

As part of the Russian plan of defeating the Ottomans, Catherine the Great hoped to inspire the Orthodox peoples of the Balkans, particularly the Moreot Greeks and the Montenegrins, to rise up against their Ottoman overlords alongside the Russian invasion forces. On 5 August 1769, Prince Yuri Vladimirovich Dolgorukov was sent from Italy by Alexis Orlov, one of Catherine's most prominent generals, to Montenegro in order to expose Šćepan and prepare the Montenegrins for the arrival of additional Russian forces. Accompanying Dolgorukov were five officers, two noncomissioned officers, one servant and twenty-six Balkan Slavs recruited in Italy. After a difficult journey constantly under the watch of Venetian informants, Dolgorukov and his party arrived in Montenegro a few days later, where they were provided with carrying aid and supplies by the locals. On 13 August, Dolgorukov confronted Šćepan at Donji Brčeli Monastery near Cetinje. Dolgorukov had also issued a written proclamation calling on all Montenegrins to send representatives to Cetinje for a great meeting on 17 August.

Šćepan arrived at the Monastery around nine in the morning on 13 August, escorted by a guard of cavalrymen. Russian sources describe him as young, about thirty years old, with a pale and smooth face, bright black and combed back curly hair, falling loosely behind his ears, and as being of medium height. His voice is described as "thin", like a woman's voice, and he spoke rapidly. The sources immediately thought he looked nothing like a Russian Tsar. They described him as dressed in the "Greek style" – he wore a white silk tunic, a red cap on his head which he never took off and carried a Turkish pipe. From his right side to his left shoulder, Šćepan wore a chain from which a pouch containing an icon hung.

Šćepan and Dolgorukov remained together for eight hours, until five in the afternoon, recorded by an anonymous member of Dolgorukov's entourage as "in obscure and giddy conversation which, apart from its inaneness, allowed one to conclude nothing". The two met again the next day, and though Šćepan was then apparently more humble and respectful than before, the Russian authors were again unsure if anything was achieved by the meeting. The Russian presence in Montenegro inflamed local patriotism and small skirmishes soon broke out along the Ottoman border, with Montenegrins engaging in raids. Fearing a premature uprising, Dolgorukov had to issue a manifesto condemning such activities for the moment. By his mere arrival in the country, Dolgorukov had provoked a volatile situation over which he had limited control.

On 15 August he travelled to Cetinje, intending to remove the only real central authority in Montenegro, Šćepan, from power. The meeting called by Dolgorukov convened outside of the city on 17 August after a church service. Two key figures were notably absent: Prince-Bishop Sava, who faked being ill in order to avoid a potentially harmful situation, and Šćepan, who pondered how to proceed. Šćepan had tried to discredit the Russians by claiming they were impostors sent by the Venetians to divide the Montenegrin people, but these attempts had failed. At Cetinje, the Russians implored the Montenegrins to abandon the impostor Šćepan, who they exposed as a fraud, and instead declare loyalty to the real ruler of Russia, Catherine the Great. A great cry of affirmation rose from the people present and the crowd swore an oath of allegiance to Russia.

Though he believed he had succeeded, Dolgorukov was awakened at five in the morning on the next day by the sound of gunshots. Šcepan and his mounted guards arrived at the monastery where Dolgorukov was staying near the capital. Although the Montenegrins had seen him exposed as an impostor and had formally sworn loyalty to Catherine the Great, they greeted him with joy and followed him. Šcepan would have lost the trust of the Montenegrin people if he had avoided the meeting. He decided to play the hero and returned to assert his rule. Šćepan spent several hours outside the monastery, telling the crowds his own version of his story, and though Dolgorukov repeatedly ordered the Montenegrin nobles to capture him, no one listened. It was not until Dolgorukov ordered his own men to capture Šćepan, or kill him if he resisted, that the Montenegrins calmed down. Despite the orders, Šćepan arrived at the monastery's gate not in chains, but on horseback as the ruler of Montenegro.

=== Imprisonment and reinstatement ===
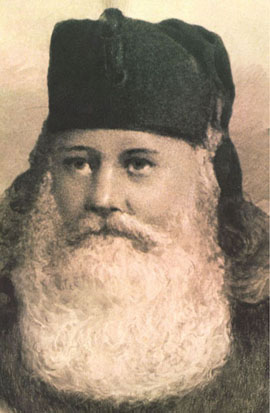
Portrait of Sava Petrović, Prince-Bishop of Montenegro 1735–1782

Šćepan was immediately disarmed and soon interrogated. Dolgorukov demanded that the supposed Tsar reveal his true identity, but Šćepan merely replied that he was "a wanderer and the smallest of the small on Earth". Dissatisfied, Dolgorukov asked what had compelled Šćepan to pretend to be Peter III of Russia. To this, Šcepan replied that he personally had never actually claimed to be Peter. Though this was technically true, it was far from an honest answer. Dolgorukov threatened that if Šćepan did not reveal his actual origin and name, he would be tortured, which impelled Šćepan to say that he came from Ioannina in Greece. Since he could not speak Greek, it was obvious that this was a lie. Following further threats of torture, Šćepan said that he was Dalmatian and that his family name was Rajčević. Though there was no proof that this was true, the Russians were satisfied that Šćepan had admitted to being a fraud and had him placed in chains in a guarded cell in the monastery. His admittance of not being Peter III was then read to the crowd of Montenegrins outside the monastery.

According to the Russian sources, the Montenegrins were by now finally convinced and would have killed Šcepan if Dolgorukov's entourage had not intervened. The imprisonment of Šćepan left Dolgorukov, since he was a representative of the respected Russian Empire, as the de facto leader of Montenegro, a role he found himself ill-prepared to perform.

Without Šćepan's leadership, the Montenegrin clans soon began feuding with each other again and raiding each other's lands, despite the Ottomans making threatening military preparations at the country's borders. Dolgorukov's orders to maintain stability and wait for further Russian forces were not only ignored, but resented. Dolgorukov also realised that his life was in danger; the Ottomans had placed a prize on his head, which he believed the Montenegrins might find attractive, and there were several Venetian plots to poison him. At one point, the powder magazine in his headquarters was blown up, something he found out had been orchestrated by the Ottomans in an attempt to kill him. As winter was approaching and he had received no word of any further Russian forces yet, Dolgorukov eventually decided to simply leave Montenegro and return to Italy.

After he secured a ship, Dolgorukov decided that he had to move closer to the coast and thus told Prince-Bishop Sava that he intended to winter in Burčele Monastery. Dolgorukov wished to keep his plans secret from the Prince-Bishop since he knew he was in contact with the Venetians. Sava suggested, since he wanted to keep a close eye on the Russians in order to send reports to Venice, that Dolgorukov could instead winter in Sava's own monastery at Stanjevići. Since Stanjevići was also close to the coast, Dolgorukov agreed.

It was agreed that the captured Šćepan be transferred in secret to Stanjevići to avoid causing any problems. On the night of 19 October, he was transferred there and once Dolgorukov and his entourage left Cetinje (and left the cells unguarded), a group of Montenegrins broke in there in an attempt to rescue Šćepan, but found his cell empty. The Russians had agreed to leave on 24 October but the problem of what to do with Šćepan still remained. Dolgorukov summoned Šćepan and informed him that the crime of impersonating Peter III was punishable by death. Despite this, he decided to pardon Šćepan, made him a Russian officer, gave him a Russian officer's uniform and officially designated him as the ruler of Montenegro.

Dolgorukov had perhaps decided to leave Šćepan in command since he did not wish Montenegro to fall into the hands of the incompetent Sava, who was allied to Venice. Dolgorukov had realised that Šćepan had shown competence in governing the country. In return, Šćepan guided the Russians through the rocky and cliffed shore down to the sea in the night. Dolgorukov later recalled in his memoirs that: "I would truly have fallen into the abyss had not Šćepan Mali, who was accustomed to such places, virtually carried me in his arms". At six in the morning the next day, Dolgorukov and his entourage left Montenegro, never to return.

=== Later rule and death ===
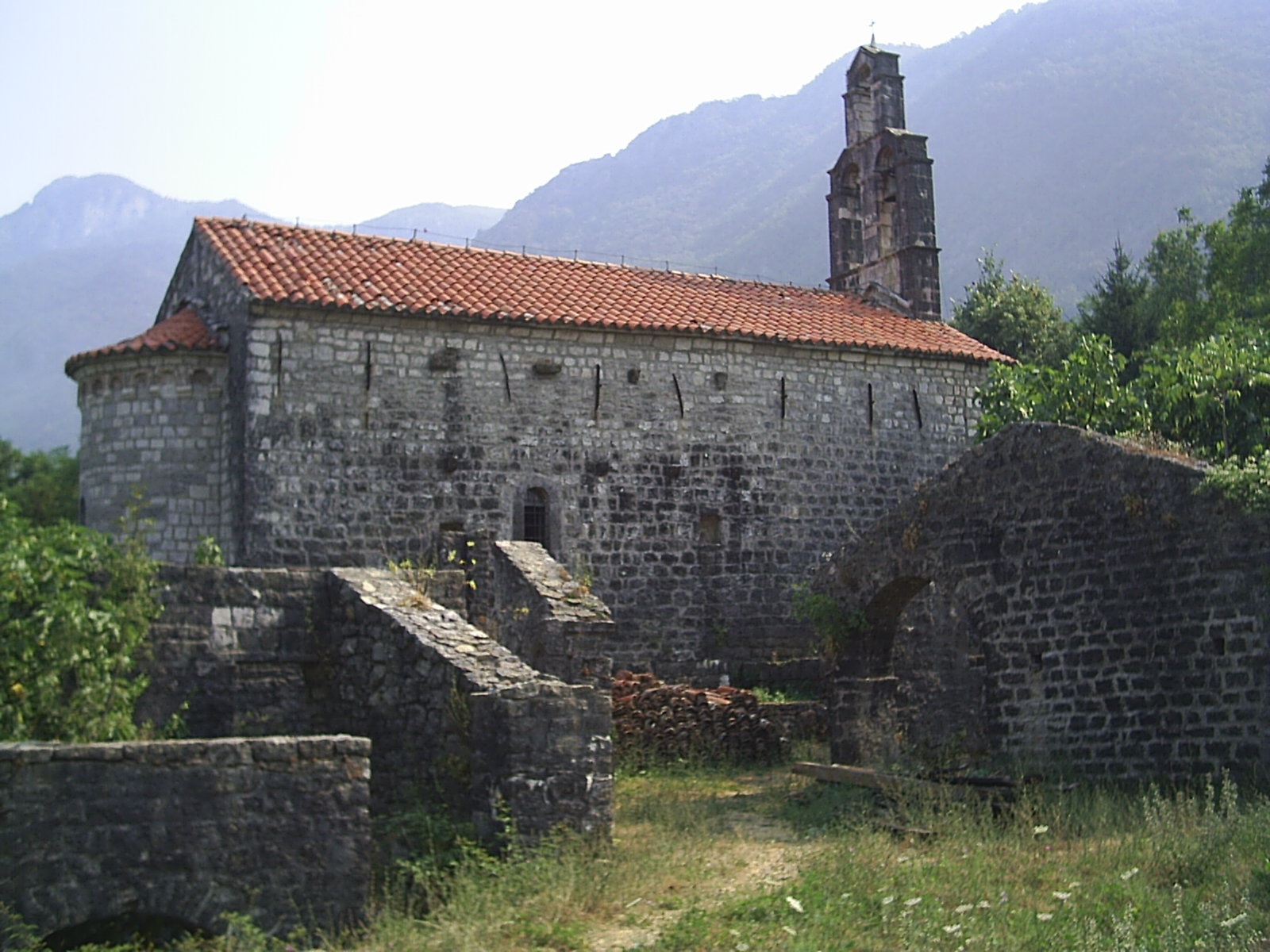
The Donji Brčeli Monastery, where Šćepan held his court and where he was murdered in 1773

Though the imprisonment had somewhat damaged his prestige, Šćepan continued to be widely recognised as an important figure by the Montenegrins. With Dolgorukov gone and the Montenegrins feeling abandoned by the Russians, his return to rule was welcomed by the people, who had grown accustomed to obeying him, and he would reign for another five years, until his death. That he was not Peter III of Russia now seemed a good thing; Catherine the Great no longer had a reason to be angry at the Montenegrins and with Dolgorukov designating him as the ruler of the country, Šćepan now had actual proof that his rule was supported by Russia.

Šćepan made certain preparations for war, but never undertook a full military campaign against the Ottomans. Alexis Orlov, though disappointed in the Montenegrins for their poor reception of Dolgorukov, promised to send aid, but never did, possibly the main reason for the lack of a campaign. In the middle of 1771, Šćepan almost died while personally supervising the construction of a military highway through the mountains. He was demonstrating to one of his soldiers how to lay a land mine, when the charge exploded, leaving him a cripple and blind in one eye. From this incident until the end of his life, Šćepan was carried around in a luxurious sedan chair, donated to him by the Republic of Ragusa. Venetian emissaries observed that he was treated "as if he were a Roman dictator".

Also in 1771, Šćepan ordered the first census in Montenegrin history. The official reason for the census was to equally distribute the stores of powder and lead left by Dolgorukov. At Vir, close to Lake Skadar, Šcepan ordered the construction of a building which was meant to serve as the headquarters of the Russian army, once they arrived to aid them against the Ottomans. The Montenegrins were tiring of Šćepan's promises of Russian aid. A Venetian report from October 1771 read that: "He has been promising them for some time that a Russian fleet would come with soldiers and supplies to support the campaign which he pretends to be preparing against Turkish Albania, but their expectations have thus far been disappointed, and this is perhaps the cause of his not being any longer in the same high repute with them".

Šćepan appeared publicly very little for a year, but his authority was again strengthened in the autumn of 1772. After a series of failed negotiations, war broke out once more between the Ottomans and Russia. Russia again became interested in Montenegro as the sole independent bastion of Orthodoxy in the Balkans. In October, a Montenegrin priest serving the Russians as a sergeant major in the Russian army, Savić Barjamović, arrived in Montenegro and confirmed Russia's belief in Šćepan's leadership and called on the country's people to obey and follow their ruler. Šćepan called a meeting of Montenegrin nobles and people and began taking measures to strengthen his government. Throughout his brief reign, Šćepan called such assemblies twenty-five times. Through these meetings, Šćepan succeeded in making the clans of Montenegro realise their common needs. A total of ninety death sentences to end vendettas are recorded to have been passed by him, alongside the same number of death sentences to punish pillaging. The death penalty had not existed in Montenegro before Šćepan introduced it. To oversee justice, he established a "Court of Twelve" composed of respected clan leaders tasked with touring Montenegro's districts and dealing justice. He even co-operated with his rival, Prince-Bishop Sava, in punishing monks who conspired to reorganise the local church. Šćepan successfully made peace with Venice and succeeded in keeping that peace through brutally punishing those Montenegrins who plundered Venetian lands.

Whether Šćepan eventually intended to wage war on the Ottomans is unknown. In 1773, one of the Ottoman governors in Albania, Kara Mahmud Pasha, decided to rid himself of the threat posed by Montenegro. Kara Mahmud bribed a Greek refugee from the Morea, who had recently entered Šćepan's service as a servant, to kill him. On 22 September 1773, the monks of the monastery where Šćepan held his court, the Donji Brčeli Monastery, discovered him in his bedroom with his throat cut from ear to ear.

== Legacy ==
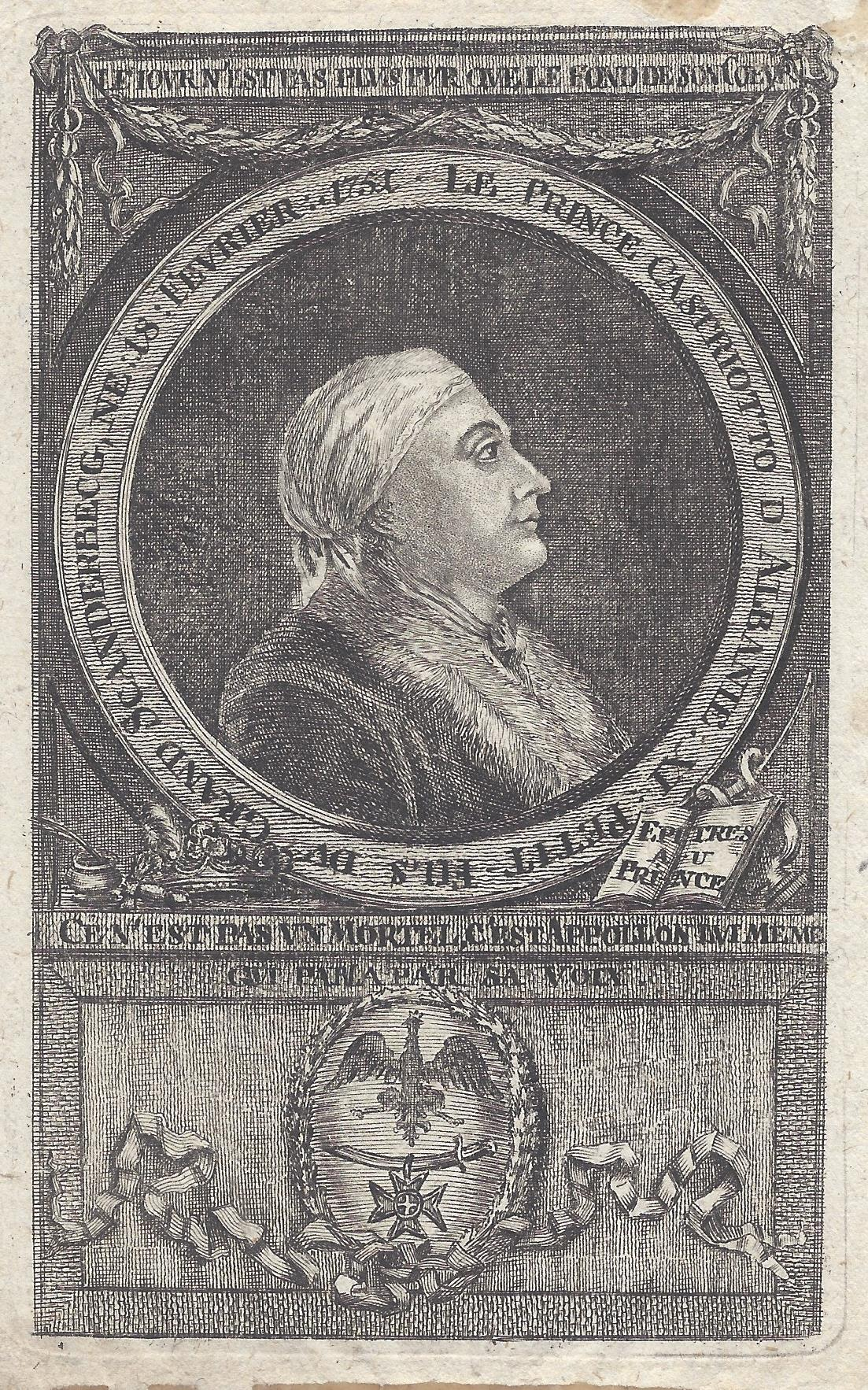
Etching of Stefano Zannowich (here under the pseudonym "Castriotto of Albania"), who wrote the first biography on Šćepan Mali (published in 1784) and at one point impersonated the deceased "tsar"

Šćepan Mali proved to be one of the most competent leaders of Montenegro up until his time. Though his reign had few long-term effects, his administrative work, including the creation of the first true executive organs of a central administration (a contingent of 80 soldiers), was an important factor in accelerating the development of Montenegro into a state. He is also noteworthy for bringing peace and order to the country and for the creation of a court of tribal leaders, effectively solving inter-tribal disputes without the need for fighting and bloodshed.

Šcepan's story is sometimes invoked in works of literature and art, as well as in journal and newspaper articles. The first work on Šćepan (French title: Stiepan-Mali, le pseudo Pierre III, empereur de Russie lit. 'Šćepan Mali, the pseudo-Peter III, Emperor of Russia'), published in 1784, was written by Montenegrin Serb writer and adventurer Stefano Zannowich. In 2020, researcher Stefan Trajković Filipović described Zannowich's book as a mysterious and bizarre publication. The location of publication is unclear (Zannowich claimed it was published in India, but Paris or London seems more likely), the book was allegedly already on its fifth edition and Zannowich attempted to remain anonymous by not signing himself as the author of the work. In the book, Zannowich described Šćepan as energetic and bold, but also malicious, willing to do anything to gain power. Zannowich further claims that Šćepan only travelled to Montenegro because he believed the people there were naive enough to believe him. After becoming the leader of the country, he supposedly ruled as a tyrant, harshly punishing even the smallest offenses. According to Zannowich, Šćepan defeated the Ottomans and was planning expeditions of conquest throughout the Balkans. Zannowich concluded that Šćepan was without a doubt an impostor, prepared to manipulate people and use ordinary people's belief in miracles to achieve what he wanted. Because of the wealth of details, though many are probably fictional, provided by Zannowich, it is possible that he met Šćepan, or was provided information by someone who had. Zannowich was so inspired by Šćepan that he at one point in 1776 wrote to Frederick the Great of Prussia, claiming to be Šćepan and arguing that he was mistakenly believed to be dead.

A novel based on Šćepan's story by German author Carl Herloßsohn was published in 1828. Titled the Der Montenegrinerhäuptling ("The Montenegrin Chief"), it imagined Šćepan as a Venetian officer by the name Stefano Piccolo (which means "Stephen the Little") who travelled to Montenegro to fulfill his dream of becoming an emperor. After Stefano gained the trust of the Montenegrins, he proclaimed that he was Peter III of Russia and seized power. Herloßsohn's novel included political intrigue in the form of people who knew Stefano was not the real Peter III and sought to expose him and a twist in the form of Stefano realising that he would never be a real emperor of Russia and thus choosing to surrender the country to the Ottomans in exchange for power. Once this scheme is revealed, Stefano is captured and beheaded.

The Serbian poet, historian and adventurer Sima Milutinović Sarajlija dedicated a few pages of his 1835 history of Montenegro, Istorija Crne Gore od iskona do novijeg vremena, to Šćepan, writing that though the people of Montenegro by this time still remembered Šćepan's brief reign as a period of peace and prosperity, Šćepan was a childish and frivolous figure who came to power through lies, writing that he lacked strength, capability and laudable personal qualities. Sarajlija's contemporary, Serbian linguist and historian Vuk Karadžić, also dedicated a few pages of his own 1837 history of Montenegro, Montenegro und die Montenegriner: ein Beitrag zur Kenntniss der europäischen Türkei und des serbischen Volkes, to Šćepan. Karadžić wrote that once the rumour that Šćepan was Peter III started spreading, it was impossible to stop as more and more Montenegrins began believing it. Though his punishments for stealing and plunder were harsh, Karadžić wrote that the people obeyed Šćepan in everything and that they had chosen to forget that the war with the Ottoman Empire, which nearly destroyed Montenegro, had been started because of him.

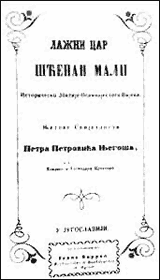
Facsimile of the 1851 first edition of the play Lažni car Šćepan Mali by Petar II Petrović-Njegoš, based on Šćepan's life

Petar II Petrović-Njegoš, Prince-Bishop of Montenegro from 1830 to 1851, created a play based on Šćepan's story, titled Lažni car Šćepan Mali ("Fake Tsar Šćepan Mali") and published in 1851. The play was overshadowed by Petrović-Njegoš's other works and not staged until 1969 in the Montenegrin National Theatre. Petrović-Njegoš had a negative opinion on Šćepan, viewing him as a liar and coward and giving him a surprisingly marginal role for a play based on his life. The play is perhaps better approached as a political drama focusing on the Montenegrins themselves and their desire for political unity, a theme still relevant in Petrović-Njegoš's day, rather than a biographical account of Šćepan, who is presented as an expression of this desire for unity. As Petrović-Njegoš was a Prince-Bishop of Montenegro, part of a line that had been briefly broken by Šćepan, he might have had personal reasons to discredit the false Tsar.

The Serbian and Montenegrin writer Stjepan Mitrov Ljubiša wrote a biography of Šćepan, published under the title Šćepan Mali kako narod o njemu povijeda ("Šćepan Mali according to folktales") in 1868. Ljubiša's version of Šćepan's story is notably more balanced than previous interpretations and was based both on written material (such as earlier works and preserved contemporary documents) and on stories he had heard from older generations of Montenegrins. The biography presents Šćepan as peaceful, fair, humble, smart and kind-hearted, but also as a vagabond who takes advantage of the gullible people of Montenegro. Ljubiša believed that Montenegro would have been a better place if Šćepan had been able to invest more time and effort and wrote that though the country suffered due to conflicts with the Ottomans and Venice during his reign, "suffering cannot be avoided on the path to progress".

In addition to his life and his rule, modern studies on Šćepan Mali have overwhelmingly focused on the mystery of his origin and intentions. Two films have been made about Šćepan's life, the first of which was Lažni car ("The Fake Tsar", 1955), directed by Ratko Đurović, which was also the first Montenegrin feature film. The Šćepan presented in the film is kind-hearted and capable and at first unwilling to lend credence to the rumours of him being Peter III. Through themes of integrity, sovereignty and order, the film also serves as a political allegory for the tensions between 1950s Yugoslavia and the Soviet Union. The second film, Čovjek koga treba ubiti ("The Man to Destroy", 1979) also portrays Šćepan as a positive character. Both films incorporate fantasy elements, including demons, and put a lot of focus on Šćepan's internal struggles, painting him as a misunderstood idealist and making him, and not the Montenegrin people he fooled, into a victim.

Šćepan survives in the cultural memory of Montenegro and the surrounding countries as the formative figure of a bizarre and extraordinary period of history and as an interruption, or perhaps even disturbance, in the otherwise conventional flow of Montenegrin history. He remains paradoxically remembered as both an ideal ruler and a fraud. His memory acts as a mystery, threads the line between fact and fiction and continues to inspire literary creations. A second play based on Šćepan's reign was published in 2002, Mirko Kovać's Lažni car Šćepan Mali koji je vladao Crnom Gorom od 1766–1773 ("The Fake Tsar Šćepan Mali who Ruled over Montenegro from 1766 to 1773"). Kovać's play presents Šćepan as being found by members of the Montenegrin elite who wish to use him as a puppet ruler in order to grow rich, but Šćepan proves surprisingly competent, introducing order to the country. The narrator of the story, which becomes an acting character within the plot as it proceeds, brings in a witness to confirm that Šćepan is Peter III, though it is clear to everyone that he is not, stating that "you need to confirm ... that Tsar Šćepan Mali is something like an incarnation of the dead Russian Tsar Peter III. Montenegrins believe that he resurrected here, if he died at all". In the play, Šćepan's last words are "I died, so I could stay" and after making sure the tsar is dead, the narrator addresses the audience, saying that "nothing changes as the centuries go by and the empires come and go. Fake emperors, however, last forever". While leaving the stage, the narrator sees that Šćepan's body has disappeared and wonders whether he has been resurrected again.

== See also ==
- False Dmitry I
- False Dmitry II
- False Dmitry III
