= Prince-Bishopric of Montenegro =

Theocratic state in Southeastern Europe

Prince-Bishopric of Montenegro Митрополство Црногорско Mitropolstvo Crnogorsko
- 1516–1852
- Flag Coat of arms

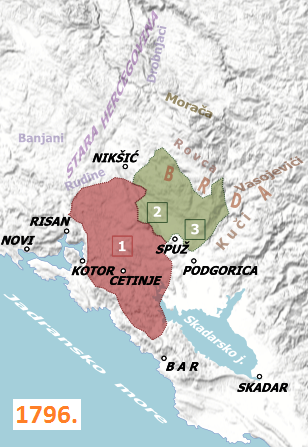
- Unification of (old) Montenegro and the Hills (1796) Area Old Montenegro (1) Area of two hill tribes Bjelopavlići (2) and Piperi (3)
- Status: Ottoman vassal state (1516–1697); Independent state (1697–1852)
- Capital: Cetinje
- Official languages: Serbian
- Religion: Serbian Orthodoxy (official religion)
- Demonym: Montenegrins
- Government: Theocratic Serbian Orthodox ecclesiastical principality (1516–1767, 1773–1852)
- Prince-Bishop
  - 1516–1520: Vavila (first) (de jure)
  - 1697–1735: Danilo (first) (de facto)
  - 1851–1852: Danilo II (last)
- Head of the Senate of Montenegro and the Highlands
  - 1831–1834: Ivan Vukotić
  - 1834–1852: Pero Petrović
- Legislature: Assembly of Montenegro and the Highlands
- History
  - Establishment: 1516
  - Secularisation: 13 March 1852
- Currency: Montenegrin perun (proposed)
Preceded by
Zeta under the Crnojevići
Sanjak of Montenegro
Montenegro vilayet
Succeeded by
Principality of Montenegro
- Today part of: Montenegro

The Prince-Bishopric of Montenegro (Serbian: Митрополство Црногорско / Mitropolstvo Crnogorsko, lit. 'Metropolitanate of the Black Mountain') was a Serbian Orthodox ecclesiastical principality that existed from 1516 until 1852. The principality was located around modern-day Montenegro. It emerged from the Eparchy of Cetinje, later known as the Metropolitanate of Montenegro and the Littoral, whose bishops defied the Ottoman Empire overlordship and transformed the parish of Cetinje into a de facto theocracy, ruling it as Metropolitans (Vladike, also known as prince-bishops).

The first prince-bishop was Vavila. The system was transformed into a hereditary one by Danilo Šćepčević, a bishop of Cetinje who united the several tribes of Montenegro into fighting the Ottoman Empire that had occupied all of Montenegro (as the Sanjak of Montenegro and Montenegro Vilayet) and most of southeastern Europe at the time. Danilo was the first in the House of Petrović-Njegoš to occupy the position as the Metropolitan of Cetinje in 1851, when Montenegro became a secular state (principality) under Danilo I Petrović-Njegoš. The Prince-Bishopric of Montenegro also briefly became a monarchy when it was temporarily abolished from 1767 to 1773, during the reign of impostor Little Stephen, who posed as the Russian Emperor and crowned himself the Tsar of Montenegro.

== Name ==
The state was virtually the Metropolitanate of Zeta under the supervision of the Petrović-Njegoš family. The name mostly used in historiography is "Metropolitanate of Cetinje" or "Cetinje Metropolitanate" (Цетињска митрополија). The highest office-holder of the polity was the Metropolitan (vladika, also rendered "prince-bishop"). Metropolitan Danilo I (1697–1735) called himself "Danil, Metropolitan of Cetinje, Njegoš, Duke of the Serb land" („Данил, владика цетињски, Његош, војеводич српској земљи..."). When Bjelopavlići and the rest of the Hills was joined into the state during the rule of Peter I, it was officially called "Black Mountain (Montenegro) and the Hills" (Црна Гора и Брда).

Travers Twiss used the English term "Prince-Bishopric of Montenegro", for the first time, in 1861.

== History ==
=== The period of elective vladikas ===
In 1504, Roman is mentioned as the Metropolitan of Zeta. In 1514, Zeta was separated from the Sanjak of Scutari and established as the separate Sanjak of Montenegro, under the rule of Skenderbeg Crnojević. In 1516, Vavila was elected as ruler of Montenegro by its clans. This event marked the foundation of the Prince-Bishopric of Montenegro. Vavila died in 1520.

Vladikas were elected for 180 years by clan chieftains and people on Montenegrin assembly called Zbor, an arrangement that was ultimately abandoned in favor of the hereditary system. The very first of them, Vavila, had a relatively peaceful reign without many Ottoman incursions, devoting most of his time to the maintenance of the printing press in Obod. His successor, German II, was not so fortunate. Skenderbeg Crnojević, an islamized member of Crnojević family put forth his claim on Montenegro, and sought to capture it as an Ottoman vassal. Vukotić, the civil governor of Montenegro, repulsed him, and such was the zeal of the Montenegrins for the Christian cause, that they marched into Bosnia and raised the siege of Jajce, where the Hungarian garrison was closely hemmed in by Ottoman troops. The Turks were too much occupied with the Hungarian war to take revenge, and it was not till 1570 that Montenegro had to face another Ottoman invasion. The next three vladikas, Paul, Nicodin, and Makarios, availed themselves of this long period of repose to increase the publications of the press, and numerous psalters and translations of the Gospels were produced in this small and remote Prince-Bishopric.

In 1570, large-scale invasions were renewed. Montenegro faced two of them led by Ali-pasha of Shkodër, the first of which was repulsed. However, the second invasion took a heavy toll on Montenegro's inhabitants. Pahomije, the prince-bishop at that moment, was unable to reach Ipek for the ceremony of consecration, and his authority was therefore weakened in the eyes of his people. The islamized renegades, allowed to settle in the country at the time of Staniša's defeat, welcomed the Pasha's army with open arms, allowing him to seize the castle of Obod and destroy the precious printing-press, which Ivan Crnojević had established there a century earlier. During Pahomije's rule, Montenegrins fought in the War of Cyprus on behalf of Republic of Venice.

The next vladika, Rufim Njeguš, ruled from 1594 to 1631. He was noted as an exceptional military leader, aiding the Banat Uprising (1594). Montenegro's refusal to pay tribute led to Ottoman invasions in 1604, 1612, and 1613, all of which he repulsed.

The first invasion culminated in the Battle of Lješkopolje (1604). Sanjak-bey of Shkodër Ali-bey Mimibegović led an army of 12,000 from Podgorica and clashed with 400 Montenegrins in Lješanska nahija. Rufim reinforced them with 500 Katunjani during the day and sent dozens of small three-members groups, in total amount of 50 warriors to spy and to attack the opponent from rear. The battle lasted through whole night, when at the dawn Montenegrins launched a sudden charge surprising the enemy. Ali-beg was wounded and retreated with 3,500 casualties, while his second-in-command Šaban Ćehaja was killed.

Eight years later, in 1612, an army of 25,000 men was dispatched against the Prince-Bishopric. The decisive battle took place near Podgorica. Despite the Ottomans' overwhelming numerical advantage, the Ottoman cavalry was ineffective in the rugged terrain of Montenegro, leading the defenders to successfully fend off the invasion.

Next year a still larger force of was collected by the newly appointed Sanjak-bey of Shkodër, Arslan-bey Balićević, to attack Montenegro. Bey split his forces in two, tasking the first army with penetration of Cetinje and second army with suppressing rebellious forces around Spuž. Both armies failed, as the first was stopped in Lješkopolje without reaching Cetinje, and the second was defeated when Rufim personally led a side attack of 700 Katunjani to the aid of Piperi, Bjelopavlići and Rovčani forces which were already engaging the enemy around the village of Kosov Lug.

The next six months were occupied with skirmishes and ambushes, and it was not until 10 September 1613 that the two armies met on the spot where Staniša had been defeated more than a century before. The Montenegrins, assisted by some neighbouring tribes, were completely outnumbered. Despite this, the Montenegrins decisively defeated the Turkish forces. Arslan-bey was wounded, and the heads of his second-in-command and a hundred other Turkish officers were carried off and stuck on the ramparts of Cetinje. The Ottoman troops fled in disorder; many were drowned in the waters of the Morača, and many more were killed by their pursuers.

In 1623 Soliman, Pasha of Shkodër, marched into the country with 80,000 men intending to finally annex it. For twenty days the opposing forces were engaged in almost ceaseless conflict before the invaders finally reached Cetinje. The capital was taken and the monastery of Ivan Crnojević was sacked. A tribute was imposed upon those who submitted, while the resistance retired to the inaccessible heights of the Lovćen and descended upon the Turkish camp. The Pasha realized that the bare mountains of the region lacked the resources to sustain his army. This led him to leave a small occupation behind and return to the fertile plains of Albania. At once the Montenegrins attacked the Turkish garrisons, while the Kuči and Klimenti tribes on the Albanian border fell upon the main body near Podgorica and almost annihilated it, leaving Montenegro free from Ottoman rule.

During the rule of Mardarije I, Visarion I, and Mardarije II, Montenegrins actively fought in the War of Candia (1645–1669) on the side of the Venetians, while during the rules of the last four elective vladikas and the first hereditary one, they took part in the Morean War (1684–1699). One of the most notable battles of that war in which Montenegro took part was the Battle of Herceg Novi in 1687, in which Venetians besieged the city from the seaside, with Montenegrins doing the same from the land. 1,500 Montenegrins were slain in battle, while only 170 Venetians fell. Montenegrins played a pivotal role in intercepting the forces of Topal Pasha which were sent to lift the siege. A force of 300 Montenegrins ambushed the army of Topal Pasha, which numbered as much as 20.000 according to The Mountain Wreath, on the narrow pass in Kameno field and routed it.

=== Danilo ===
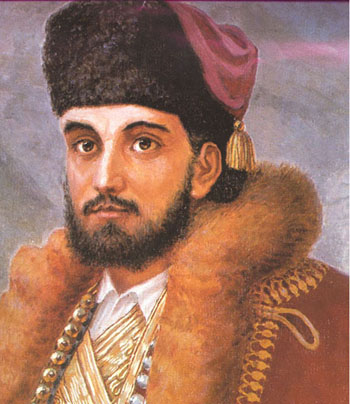
Danilo I of Montenegro

During the reign of Danilo two important changes occurred in the wider European context of Montenegro: the expansion of the Ottoman state was gradually reversed, and Montenegro found in the Russian Empire a powerful new patron to replace the declining Venice. The replacement of Venice by Russia was especially significant, since it brought financial aid (after Danilo visited Peter the Great in 1715), modest territorial gain, and, in 1789, formal recognition by the Ottoman Porte of Montenegro's independence as a state under Petar I Petrović Njegoš.

=== Sava and Vasilije ===
Metropolitan Danilo was succeeded by co-rulers Metropolitan Sava and Metropolitan Vasilije. Sava was predominantly occupied with clerical duties and did not enjoy as much influence among tribal heads as his predecessor did. However, he managed to keep good relations with Russia and to get considerable help from Peter the Great's successor, Empress Elizabeth. During his trip to Russia his deputy and eventual successor Vasilije Petrović gained considerable respect among the tribes by giving support to those who were attacked by the Ottomans. He was as much hated by the Venetians as he was by the Ottomans. Vasilije was also active in trying to solicit Russian support for Montenegro. For that purpose he traveled to Russia three times, where he also died in 1766. He also wrote one of the earliest historical books on Montenegro, History of Montenegro.

=== Šćepan Mali ===
In 1766, a person known as Šćepan Mali ("Stephen the Little") appeared in Montenegro, rumoured to be Russian Emperor Peter III, who in fact had been assassinated in 1762. Having affection for Russia, the Montenegrins accepted him as their Emperor (1768). Metropolitan Sava had told the people that Šćepan was an ordinary crook, but the people believed him instead. Following this event Šćepan put Sava under house arrest in the Stanjevići monastery. Šćepan was very cruel and thus both respected and feared. After realizing how much respect he commanded, and that only he could keep Montenegrins together, Russian diplomat Dolgoruki abandoned his efforts to discredit Šćepan, even giving him financial support. In 1771 Šćepan founded the permanent court composed of the most respected clan chiefs, and stubbornly insisted on respect of the court's decision.

The importance of Šćepan's personality in uniting Montenegrins was realized soon after his assassination conducted by order of Kara Mahmud Bushati, the pasha of Scutari, when Montenegrin tribes once again engaged into blood feuding among themselves. Bushati tried to seize the opportunity and attacked Kuči with 30,000 troops. For the first time since Metropolitan Danilo, the Kuči were helped by Piperi and Bjelopavlići, and defeated the Albanians twice in two years.

=== Petar I ===
After Šćepan's death, gubernadur (title created by Metropolitan Danilo to appease Venetians) Jovan Radonjić, with Venetian and Austrian help, tried to impose himself as the new ruler. However, after the death of Sava (1781), the Montenegrin chiefs chose archimandrite Petar Petrović, who was a nephew of Metropolitan Vasilije, as successor.

Petar I assumed the leadership of Montenegro at a very young age and during most difficult times. He ruled almost half a century, from 1782 to 1830. Petar I won many crucial victories against the Albanians, including at Martinići and Krusi in 1796. With these victories, Petar I liberated and consolidated control over the Highlands (Brda) that had been the focus of constant warfare, and also strengthened bonds with the Bay of Kotor, and consequently the aim to expand into the southern Adriatic coast.

In 1806, as French Emperor Napoleon advanced toward the Bay of Kotor, Montenegro, aided by several Russian battalions and a fleet of Dmitry Senyavin, went to war against the invading French forces. Undefeated in Europe, Napoleon's army was however forced to withdraw after defeats at Cavtat and at Herceg-Novi. In 1807, the Russian–French treaty ceded the Bay to France. The peace lasted less than seven years; in 1813, the Montenegrin army, with ammunition support from Russia and Britain, liberated the Bay from the French. An assembly held in Dobrota resolved to unite the Bay of Kotor with Montenegro. But at the Congress of Vienna, with Russian consent, the Bay was instead granted to Austria. In 1820, to the north of Montenegro, the Morača tribe won a major battle against an Ottoman force from Bosnia.

During his long rule, Petar strengthened the state by uniting the often quarreling tribes, consolidating his control over Montenegrin lands, and introducing the first laws in Montenegro. He had unquestioned moral authority strengthened by his military successes. His rule prepared Montenegro for the subsequent introduction of modern institutions of the state: taxes, schools and larger commercial enterprises. When he died, he was by popular sentiment proclaimed a saint.

=== Petar II ===
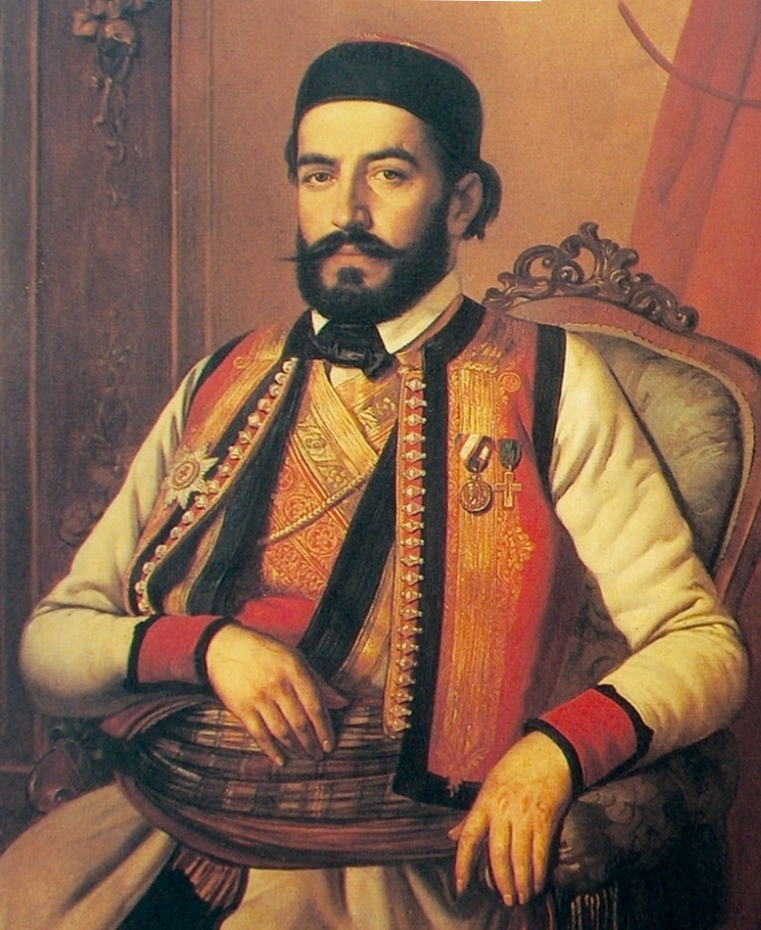
Petar II Petrović Njegoš, Lord of Montenegro, poet and philosopher

Following the death of Petar I, his 17-year-old nephew, Rade Petrović, became Metropolitan Petar II. By historical and literary consensus, Petar II, commonly called "Njegoš", was the most impressive of the prince-bishops, having laid the foundation of the modern Montenegrin state and the subsequent Kingdom of Montenegro. He was also an acclaimed Montenegrin poet.

A long rivalry had existed between the Montenegrin metropolitans from the Petrović family and the Radonjić family, a leading clan which had long vied for power against the Petrović's authority. This rivalry culminated in Petar II's era, though he came out victorious from this challenge and strengthened his grip on power by expelling many members of the Radonjić family from Montenegro.

In domestic affairs, Petar II was a reformer. He introduced the first taxes in 1833 against stiff opposition from many Montenegrins whose strong sense of individual and tribal freedom was fundamentally in conflict with the notion of mandatory payments to the central authority. He created a formal central government consisting of three bodies, the Senate, the Guardia and the Perjaniks. The Senate consisted of 12 representatives from the most influential Montenegrin families and performed executive and judicial as well as legislative functions of government. The 32-member Guardia traveled through the country as agents of the Senate, adjudicating disputes and otherwise administering law and order. The Perjaniks were a police force, reporting both to the Senate and directly to the Metropolitan.

Before his death in 1851, Petar II named his nephew Danilo as his successor. He assigned him a tutor and sent him to Vienna, from where he continued his education in Russia. According to some historians Petar II most likely prepared Danilo to be a secular leader. However, when Petar II died, the Senate, under influence of Djordjije Petrović (the wealthiest Montenegrin at the time), proclaimed Petar II's elder brother Pero as Prince and not Metropolitan. Nevertheless, in a brief struggle for power, Pero, who commanded the support of the Senate, lost to the much younger Danilo who had more support among the people. In 1852, Danilo proclaimed a secular Principality of Montenegro with himself as Prince and formally abolished ecclesiastical rule.

== Aftermath ==
In Danilo I's Code, dated to 1855, he explicitly states that he is the "knjaz (duke, prince) and gospodar (lord) of the Free Black Mountain (Montenegro) and the Hills".

The new Principality of Montenegro lasted until 1910, when Prince Nicholas I proclaimed the Kingdom of Montenegro.

== Organization ==
- Common council (zbor) in Cetinje; assemblies of the Metropolitan and tribes that recognized his spiritual leadership.

Aristocratic titles

- serdar (from Turkish serdar), tribal chieftain and general
- guvernadur (from Italian governatore), hereditary title appointed from the Radonjić brotherhood (1718–1831)

== List of rulers ==
Elective vladikas

- Vavila (Metropolitan from 1493) (1516–1520)
- German II (1520–1530)
- Pavle (1530–1532)
- Vasilije I (1532–1540)
- Nikodim (1540)
- Romil (1540–1559)
- Makarije (1560–1561)
- Ruvim I (1561–1569)
- Pahomije II (1569–1579)
- Gerasim (1575–1582)
- Venijamin (1582–1591)
- Nikanor and Stefan (1591–1593)
- Ruvim II (1593–1636)
- Mardarije I (1639–1649)
- Visarion I (1649–1659)
- Mardarije II (1659–1673)
- Ruvim III (1673–1685)
- Vasilije II (1685)
- Visarion II (1685–1692)
- Sava I (1694–1697)

Petrović-Njegoš Metropolitans of Cetinje

- Danilo I (1697–1735)
- Sava II (1735–1781); with Vasilije III (1750–1766)

Prince

- Šćepan Mali (1767–1773)

Metropolitan of Cetinje (not Petrović-Njegoš)

- Arsenije Plamenac (1781–1784)

Petrović-Njegoš Metropolitans of Cetinje

- Petar I (1784–1830)
- Petar II (1830–1851)
- Danilo II (1851–1852)

== See also ==
- List of Metropolitans of Montenegro
- Old Montenegro
- Brda
- Vassal and tributary states of the Ottoman Empire
- Kurdish emirates
- Hochstift
- Papal States
- Monastic community of Mount Athos
- Hospitaller Malta
- Mount Lebanon Emirate

== Sources ==
- Stamatović, Aleksandar (1999). "Митрополија црногорска за вријеме митрополита Петровића". Кратка историја Митрополије Црногорско-приморске (1219–1999).
- Stanojević, Gligor; Vasić, Milan (1975). Istorija Crne Gore (3): od početka XVI do kraja XVIII vijeka. Titograd: Redakcija za istoriju Crne Gore. OCLC 799489791.
