= Sava Petrović (metropolitan) =

Metropolitan of Cetinje

- Metropolitan of Montenegro, Skenderija and the Coast
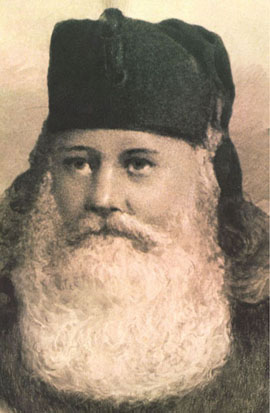
- Church: Serbian Patriarchate of Peć
- Metropolis: Cetinje
- See: Cetinje
- Installed: 1735
- Term ended: 1781
- Predecessor: Danilo I
- Successor: Arsenije Plamenac

Personal details
- Born: 18 January 1702 Njeguši, Prince-Bishopric of Montenegro
- Died: 9 March 1782 (aged 80) Podmaine monastery, Republic of Venice (now Montenegro)
- Denomination: Eastern Orthodox Christianity
- Parents: Ivan Petrović
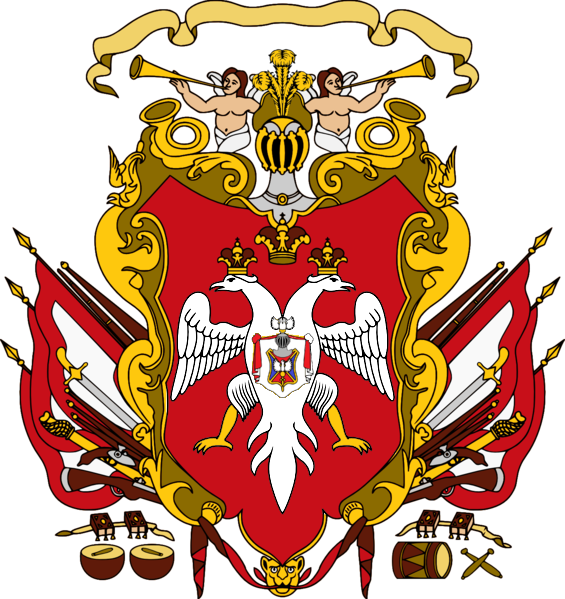
- Coat of arms

Sava Petrović (Serbian Cyrillic: Сава Петровић; 18 January 1702 – 9 March 1782) was the Metropolitan of Cetinje between 1735 and 1781, ruling what is known in historiography as the Prince-Bishopric of Montenegro; the polity in the hands of the Petrović-Njegoš dynasty. He succeeded his relative Danilo I as Metropolitan in 1735, having served as Danilo's coadjutor since the 1719, when he was consecrated by Serbian Patriarch Mojsije I.

Sava was a lesser memorable figure in Montenegrin history, having served during a period of constant and bitter tribal rivalries and power struggles in tribal leadership.

== History ==
In 1735 Sava officially became the Metropolitan (vladika, rendered as "prince-bishop") of Cetinje, succeeding Danilo I. He was a contemplative man and not as energetic as his predecessor, and sought to cultivate good relations with both Venice and Russia. That year, a new war broke out between Russia and the Ottoman Empire, with Austria on Russia's side. Tribesmen from Montenegro welcomed this as they saw an opportunity for their struggle for independence. Hajduk (bandit and rebel) activity increased as a result. Sava continued to seek some sort of appeasement with Venice, a policy that suited his conservative nature. His goal was securing more open borders for Montenegro, which was already suffering under blockades imposed by its invading Western and Eastern neighbors on all sides.

By October 1739 the Austrians had been forced to sign the Treaty of Belgrade which saw the Kingdom of Serbia (including Belgrade), the southern part of the Banat of Temeswar and northern Bosnia to be ceded to the Ottomans (these were mostly gains in the wars of 1714–1718). In Montenegro, the pattern of raids and counter-attacks continued unabated with Highlander tribes (in Brda) taking the brunt of Ottomans reprisals. In 1740, Highlander tribes sent forty of their chieftains to negotiate with representatives of the new Pasha of Scutari who appeared to be set on an offensive that would make resistance futile. They wound up captured and decapitated, and another 400 of their compatriots taken into slavery on the orders of the Paša himself.

Sava sought help from Orthodox Russia, offering to provide troops to serve in the Imperial Russian armies in return for some form of Russian protectorate over Montenegro. At the end of September 1742, Sava set off in person, and on reaching St. Petersburg the following spring he presented Montenegro's case to the newly enthroned Empress Elizabeth. The empress promised financial aid, including further funds for the Cetinje monastery, but did not offer Montenegro any military protection. As he made his way back through Berlin, Frederick the Great gave him a beautiful golden cross, though his journey did little to improve Montenegro's fortunes, leading him to withdraw from public life.

From 1744 to 1766, Metropolitan Vasilije Petrović Njegoš, Sava's coadjutator, became effectively the highest authority in Montenegro and its representative abroad. After Vasilije died at St. Petersburg in 1766, Sava again resumed his duties as Metropolitan (Prince-Bishop).

In 1766 the Serbian Patriarchate of Peć was banned by the Ottomans (the Greek clergy also applied pressure in this matter). Sava then responded by writing to the Moscow Metropolitan that "the Serb Nation is under hard slavery" and so asked the Most Holy Synod of Russia to help the Serbian Patriarch. Sava also wrote a letter to the Russian Empress asking "Protect the Serbs from the Greek and Turkish intruding [...] We are ready to pay Russia in blood". He enumerated the Montenegrins among this "Serbian nation".

In 1767, he wrote to the Republic of Ragusa that the Cetinje Metropolitanate was "happy that the [Ragusan] government still used our Serbian language".

He was succeeded as Metropolitan by Arsenije Plamenac.

== Title ==
- When introducing himself to Empress Elizabeth of Russia (r. 1741–1762), he used "Metropolitan of Skenderija, the Coast and Montenegro — (mitropolit skenderiski i primorski i Črne Gore povelitelj)
- "Metropolitan of Montenegro, Skenderija and the Coast, and Exarch of the Holy Throne of the Slav–Serb Patriarchate in Peć" — ("Митрополит црногорски, скендеријски и приморски и егзарх св. пријестола словеносрпске патријаршије у Пећи".)

== Annotations ==
- Name: In modern historiography his full name is sometimes written Sava Petrović Njegoš (Сава Петровић Његош), or Sava Petrović-Njegoš. Other spellings include Sava Petrović Njeguš (Сава Петровић Његуш)

Eastern Orthodox Church titles
Preceded by Danilo I as Bishop of Cetinje	Metropolitan of Cetinje ("Montenegro, Skenderija and the Coast"); 1735–1781	Succeeded by Arsenije Plamenac as Metropolitan of Cetinje
