= Mardarije =

Mardarije is a male Serbian given name. Notable people with Mardarije given name include:

- Hieromonk Mardarije, a 16th-century Serbian Orthodox hieromonk and one of the most important early Serbian printers
- Hegumen Mardarije (fl. 1543 – c. 1545), Serbian Orthodox hegumen and monk who was one of the first printers of Serbian-language books
- Mardarije Kornečanin (fl. 1625 – c. 1659), Serbian Orthodox (1637–1640) and later Eastern Catholic (1640–1659) Metropolitan of Cetinje
- Mardarije Uskoković (1889–1935), Serbian Orthodox Bishop of America and Canada and saint
