= Rufim Njeguš =

Rufim (Ruvim) III Njeguš
- Metropolitan of Montenegro and the Littoral
- Metropolis: Metropolitan of Cetinje
- See: Cetinje
- Installed: c. 1593
- Term ended: c. 1637
- Predecessor: Nikanor and Stevan
- Successor: Mardarije Kornečanin

Personal details
- Denomination: Serbian Orthodox

Prince-Bishop of Montenegro
- Reign: 1593–1636
- Predecessor: Stefan
- Successor: Mardarije Kornečanin
- Born: Njeguši, Montenegro
- Died: 1636/July 1637
Names
- Rufim III Njeguš
- House: Njeguš

Rufim Njeguš (Serbian Cyrillic: Руфим Његуш; fl. 1594–1631) was the Metropolitan of Cetinje between 1594 and 1636. He succeeded the Metropolitan duo of Nikanor and Stevan (s. 1591–93). He is listed as Ruvim III. Rufim Njeguš and Metropolitan Visarion of Trebinje (s. 1590–1602) aided the Banat Uprising (1594). In 1595 Francesco Antonio Bertucci tried to convince Rufim to accept union with the Catholic Church. He was succeeded by Mardarije Kornečanin (s. 1637–59). Rufim is famous as being the first metropolitan who actively took part in armed confrontations with the Ottoman Empire, leading Montenegrin army in three major battles in 1601, 1604 and 1613.

== Battle of Lješkopolje (1604) ==
Sanjak-bey of Shkodër Ali-beg Mimibegović led an army of 12,000 from Podgorica and clashed with 400 Montenegrins in Lješanska nahija. Rufim reinforced them with 500 Katunjani during the day and sent dozens of small three-members groups, in total amount of 50 warriors to spy and to attack the opponent from rear. The battle lasted through whole night, when at the dawn Montenegrins launched a sudden charge surprising the enemy. Ali-beg was wounded and retreated with 3,500 casualties, while his second-in-command Šaban Ćehaja was killed.

== Battle of Kosov lug (1613) ==
Towards the end of September newly appointed Sanjak-bey of Shkodër Arslan-bey Balićević renewed attacks on Montenegrins, splitting his forces in two, and tasking first army with penetration to Cetinje and second army with suppressing rebellious forces around Spuž. Both armies failed, as the first one was stopped in Lješanska nahija again without reaching Cetinje, and the second one was defeated when Rufim personally led a side attack of 700 Katunjani in the aid of Piperi, Bjelopavlići and Rovčani forces which were already engaging enemy around the village of Kosov lug. The battle resulted in Sultan's official recognition of Montenegrin autonomy, by issuing a berat which states that: "... no Turkish official, if not authorised by Sultan, can enter Montenegro without the permission from Montenegrins themselves".

== Legacy ==
Although informations about his life are scarce, Rufim is one of better known Metropolitans of Montenegrin history from predynastic period. His long tenure is well remembered and he is often mentioned as a contemporary of Patriarch Pajsije. In his "History of Montenegro" Sima Sarajlija lists as one of his more memorable deeds that he:

This Metropolitan has done an exceptional deed for Orthodox Christianity and thus awoke the Serbdom with no small extent, by converting back to eastern religion Kuči, Bratonožići and Drekalovići, from Roman faith to which they were lured shortly before by Albanian priests, with whom they share a border and sibling relations

— Sima Milutinović Sarajlija, History of Montenegro

It is, thus, possible that it was him, rather than Metropolitan Rufim Boljević who famously converted Kuči Vojvode Lale Drekalov. Many authors, most notably Marko Miljanov, cite Boljević as being the one, however the dates do not add up, since being mentioned in 1614, Lale precedes Boljević's tenure as Metropolitan by a couple of decades.

== See also ==
- List of Metropolitans of Montenegro

== Annotations ==
- Name: His name is mostly spelled Rufim Njeguš (Руфим Његуш), while his given name can be spelled as Ruvim (Рувим), and his byname as Njegoš, as well. He is sometimes numbered Rufim III (Руфим III), to disambiguate from previous Rufim II (1561–1569), who was also from Njeguši (sometimes named Rufim Veljekrajski, after a village Velji Kraj in Njeguši tribe) and Rufim Boljević (Rufim IV), the later metropolitan.

== Bibliography ==
- Filip Ivanović (2006). Problematika autokefalije Mitropolije Crnogorsko-primorske. Unireks. p. 29. ISBN 9788676600335.
- Editions speciales. Naučno delo. 1971. "Дошло ]е до похреаа Срба у Ба- нату, ко]и су помагали тадаппьи црногоски владика, Херувим и тре- бюьски, Висарион. До покрета и борбе против Ту рака дошло ]е 1596. године и у Цр- иэ] Гори и сус]едним племенима у Харцеговгаш, нарочито под утица- ]ем поменутог владике Висариона."
