= Samuilo =

Samuilo (Самуило) is a Serbian masculine given name, a variant of Samuel. It may refer to:

- Samuilo Jakovljević (1760–1825), Orthodox clergyman and Serbian diplomatic envoy
- Samuilo Maširević (1804–1870), Patriarch of Karlovci
