= Lješ =

Lješ is a Montenegrin masculine given name, a diminutive of Aleksa and may refer to:

== Geography ==
- Lješanska nahija, historical region in Montenegro
- Lezhë, town in Albania, known in Montenegrin as Lješ (Montenegrin Cyrillic: Љеш)

== People ==
- Aleksa Đurašević, known as Lješ, Montenegrin nobleman from Zeta

== See also ==
- Lje, a letter of the Cyrillic script
- Lješevo, village in Bosnia and Herzegovina
- Lješnica (disambiguation)
- Lještansko, village in Serbia
- Lješljani, village in Bosnia and Herzegovina
