= Pavlin =

Pavlin may refer to:

- Kim Daniela Pavlin (born 1992), Croatian swimmer
- Luka Pavlin (born 1988), Slovenian footballer
- Miran Pavlin
- Žiga Pavlin
- Pavlin Demski
- Pavlin Dhembi
- Pavlin Ivanov (basketball)
- Pavlin Todorov

== See also ==
- Paulin (disambiguation)
