= Samuilo Jakovljević =

- Самуило Јаковљевић

Personal life
- Born: Jakovljević; 1760
- Died: 14 August 1825 (aged 64–65) Constantinople, Ottoman Empire
- Resting place: St. Paraskeva Church in Hasköy, Turkey
- Parents: Jakov Obrenović (father); Đurđija (mother)

Religious life
- Religion: Christianity
- Denomination: Eastern Orthodox
- Church: Ecumenical Patriarchate of Constantinople
- Monastic name: Samuilo

Senior posting
- Based in: Studenica, Fenek, Kalenić
- Post: deacon, hieromonk, hegumen

Samuilo Jakovljević (Serbian: Самуило Јаковљевић; 1760–1825) was a Serbian Orthodox clergyman, armed priest in the First Serbian Uprising (1804–13), and diplomatic envoy of Prince Miloš Obrenović, his paternal uncle. He was imprisoned with the rest of a Serbian delegation sent to the Porte in 1820, and died in prison.

== Early life ==
Jakovljević was born in Podgor in the Novi Pazar nahiya in 1760. He was the eldest son of Jakov Obrenović (d. 1811), the half-brother of Miloš Obrenović, and mother Đurđija. Petar Jakovljević (d. 1813, buried at Semedraž) may have been his brother. He learnt to read and write in the Studenica Monastery. Metropolitan of Prizren Janićije appointed him deacon and hieromonk in 1785. In 1794, Jakovljević killed the notorious thug Kadrija from Stup.

== Uprising ==
Jakovljević joined the Serbian insurgents in the First Serbian Uprising (1804–13). Jakovljević and archimandrite Melentije Nikšić with a couple of other Studenica monks served as military leaders. Due to his involvement in the uprising he was forced to leave Serbia with the suppression and return of Ottoman rule. In 1813 he and the rest of the Studenica brotherhood (Nikšić and 15 monks) fled to Syrmia and stayed at Fenek until 1815. The Studenica monks had taken the relics of Stefan the First-Crowned to Vraćevšnica and Fenek. Priest Matija Nenadović met up with Karađorđe at Fenek after the fall of Serbia (October 1813) and wrote in his memoirs that one evening one of the Studenica monks raised his glass "for Supreme Leader Đorđe Petrović (Karađorđe), Serb Commander" upon which Karađorđe cried heavily and for long. Jakovljević returned to Serbia in late 1815 and stayed at Kalenić. In 1817 Metropolitan Agatangel appointed him hegumen of Kalenić.

== Delegation ==
Prince Miloš sent him as part of the fifth delegation to Constantinople to discuss Serbia's autonomy with the Porte. This fifth delegation was to discuss very important matters, with Serbian points including the enlargement of Serbian borders according to the Treaty of Bucharest (1812), the fixation of yearly tribute, the proclamation of hereditary rule of Miloš Obrenović, allowing the building of churches and schools, the expulsion of "Turks" (Muslims) from all places except fortifications. They left Serbia on 29 October 1820. When Marashli Pasha heard the names of the deputies, he called them peasants and asked why Obrenović did not send any relative, upon which Obrenović replied in a letter that two indeed were his family (Dimitrije Đorđević was his blood brother and Jakovljević his "cousin"). As the talks began in late 1820, they were stopped in 1821 due to the Greek Uprising, and the delegation made up of Jakovljević, Vujica Vulićević, Dimitrije Đorđević, Ilija Marković, Miloje Vukašinović, Avram Petronijević, Rista Dukić and Sava Ljotić were all imprisoned by the Ottoman authorities. They were held hostages under the supervision of bostanji-bashi imperial guards and lived in fear. The Porte did this perhaps to hold Miloš and Serbia in check. Jakovljević was also sent to Constantinople to take up matters regarding the Serbian Church with the Ecumenical Patriarchate (especially the appointment of ethnic Serbs as bishops), and was thought of as a candidate for the Užice-Valjevo Metropolitanate. There were at that time problems with Gerasim Domnin, the metropolitan of Užice-Valjevo. Jakovljević died in prison 14 August 1825.

Jakovljević was buried at the St. Paraskeva Church in Hasköy. Prince Miloš held Jakovljević as an important part of the delegation and upon hearing of his death ordered for 40 days of liturgy in the Požega nahija churches mentioning him. Miloš Obrenović erected a memorial stone to Jakovljević in June 1827. A new marble gravestone was put in 1839 by Miloš Obrenović and Avram Petronijević. The church includes graves and memorials of eight Serbs, including also Avram Petronijević.

== See also ==
- List of Serbian Revolutionaries
- Armed priest

== Sources ==
- Filipović, Milenko S. (1960). Таково. Научно дело.
- Milićević, Milan Đ. (1888). Поменик знаменитих људи у српског народа новијега доба. Издање Чупићеве задужбине. pp. 189–191 – via Archive.org.
- Pavlović, Leontije (1987). "Studenički monasi od 1790. do 1850. godine". Историјски часопис. 33. Istorijski institut: 155–167.
- Popović, Radomir J.; Katić, Srđan; Prcović, Miroslav (2012). "Srpski grobovi u crkvi svete Paraskeve u istanbulskom kvartu Haskoj". Istorijski časopis. 61: 165–186.
- Radosavljević, Nedeljko V. (2007). Православна црква у Београдском пашалуку 1766-1831. Istorijski institut. pp. 141, 341, 346–347. ISBN 978-86-7743-065-8.
