= Kornet (Podgorica) =

Kornet Корнет
- Settlement
- Location within Montenegro
- Country: Montenegro
- Municipality: Podgorica

Population (2011)
  - Total: 59
- Time zone: UTC+1 (CET)
  - Summer (DST): UTC+2 (CEST)

Kornet (Serbian Cyrillic: Корнет) is a settlement in the municipality of Podgorica, Montenegro.

It is the birthplace of Mardarije Uskoković, a saint in the Serbian Orthodox Church.

== Demographics ==
According to the 2011 census, its population was 59.

== Notable people ==
- Mardarije Kornečanin
- Mardarije Uskoković
