= Plamenac =

Plamenac (Serbian Cyrillic: Пламенац, also transliterated Plamenatz) is a Montenegrin surname, derived from the word plamen (flame), literally meaning "out of the flame".

It has origins from the Boljevići of the Crmnica nahija in Montenegro. Its bearers are ethnic Montenegrins, of Orthodox faith. The family descends from Ilija Bogustinović, a nobleman from Montenegro, became a prominent figure on the court of Lord Ivan Crnojević. He earned a nickname Plamenac (fiery), because at the meeting on Vranjina Island in 1492 he spoke so passionately campaigning for the war against the Turks that it seemed as the fire was coming out of his mouth, as observed by a Venetian envoy present at the meeting.

It may refer to:

- Arsenije Plamenac (fl. 1766 – 1784), Montenegrin Vladika (Bishop)
- Ilija Plamenac (1821 – 1916), Montenegrin Vojvoda (Duke), Senator and politician
- Jovan Plamenac redirect to
  - Jovan S. Plamenac (1873–1944), Montenegrin politician and minister, Serdar (Count)
- Dragan Plamenac (b. Dragan Siebenschein; 1895 – 1983), Jewish Croatian (later US) conductor, composer & musicologist
- John Plamenatz (1912 – 1975) (Jovan P. Plamenac), member of government in exile and political scientist at Oxford
- Markiša Plamenac, Montenegrin captain
- Marko Plamenac, Montenegrin Serdar (Count)
- Mitar Plamenac, Montenegrin diplomat
- Mojaš Plamenac, Montenegrin Serdar (Count)
- Petar Plamenac, Montenegrin politician and diplomat
- Rade Turov Plamenac (1842–1919), Montenegrin Serdar (Count)
- Rufim Boljević (fl. 1673 – 1685), member of Plamenac brotherhood and hence rarely referred to as Rufin Plamenac, Montenegrin Orthodox metropolitan of Cetinje
- Turo Plamenac, Montenegrin Serdar (Count) and Senator
