= Mardarije Kornečanin =

- Metropolitan of Cetinje
- Church: Serbian Patriarchate of Peć
- Metropolis: Metropolitanate of Cetinje
- See: Cetinje
- Installed: July 1637
- Term ended: 1659
- Predecessor: Rufim Njeguš
- Successor: Rufim Boljević

Personal details
- Born: Unknown Kornet, Ottoman Empire (modern Montenegro)
- Died: Unknown
- Denomination: Eastern Orthodox (until 1640); Eastern Catholic (since 1640)
- Residence: Cetinje

Mardarije Kornečanin (Serbian Cyrillic: Мардарије Корнечанин; fl. 1625–59) was an Eastern Orthodox bishop in Montenegro and Primorje, serving as the Metropolitan of Cetinje from 1637 to 1659, under the jurisdiction of the Serbian Patriarchate of Peć. After 1640, he entered into negotiations with the Catholic Church, hoping to achieve political and military support through Church Union. He succeeded Metropolitan Rufim Njeguš, and was succeeded by Rufim Boljević.

== Life ==
Born in Kornet, in the Lješanska nahija, Old Montenegro, his surname was Uskoković. He was the hegumen of the Cetinje Monastery since 1625. He is mentioned in a book written in 1631 in the Hilandar monastery. He is mentioned as a Metropolitan for the first time in July 1637. The previous Metropolitan bishop was Rufim Njeguš.

In 1637, he also had jurisdiction over the Bay of Kotor and Paštrovići. The same year peasants from around Cetinje "pressured Church land" and were, quoting Mardarije "stealing from the monastery and doing much evil". Mardarije and the monastic brotherhood brought the suit to the Sultan's kadi (judge), as Montenegro at the time was "ruled by the Ottomans" (as said by himself). The monastic brotherhood brought the chrysobulls of Ivan Crnojević and other documents, and the Ottoman judge then confirmed the monastery's property.

The first report of a Montenegrin bishop secretly getting in contact with the papacy about the possibility of a church union was recorded in 1638, when Mardarije met with Francesco Leonardi; this was viewed of by the Papacy as the beginning of the plan of conversion of all Montenegro. He was imprisoned by the Ottomans due to his closeness with the Papacy and then released from prison in 1639 or 1640, after which he met up with Francesco Leonardi in the Bay of Kotor. The Vatican Congregation for Propaganda sought to gain Mardarije and Pajsije I, the Serbian Patriarch of Peć, to the church union (1640). In 1640 Mardarije accepted church union with the papacy. According to traditional folklore, he was stoned by Montenegrins for this action, although there are no factual proofs of this. He was also in favour of placing Montenegro under Venetian suzerainty. His title is unknown, though in 1640 he called himself "bishop [...] from the Macedonian region of the land of Montenegro, of the Cetinje monastery" (episkup ... od predel makedonskih, zemle Crne Gore, od manastira Cetinja) or simply "of Montenegro" (ot zemle Crne Gore), and also as Latin: Marderius Dei gratia Episcopus Macedoniae, patriae Magni Alexandri, Montisnigri.

Although the church union did not last, the Montenegrins continued cooperation with the Republic of Venice. He is believed to have been last mentioned in 1659. The same year, he was succeeded by Visarion II Kolinović from Ljubotinj as the acting metropolitan. Visarion was ordinated as co-adjutor earlier by Mardarije and thus often acted as an official negotiator with Venetians. His tenure was short, ending in 1662. The next metropolitan was Rufim Boljević (fl. 1673–d. 1685).

== See also ==
- List of Metropolitans of Montenegro
- Rufim Njeguš
- Rufim Boljević
- Vasilije Veljkrajski
- Pavlin Demski, seventeenth-century Catholic missionary

== Sources ==
- Ćirković, Sima (2004). The Serbs. Malden: Blackwell Publishing. ISBN 9781405142915.
