= Goljemadi =

Albanian tribe

Gojëmadhi (or Goljemad) was an Albanian tribe (fis) that lived in the Middle Ages. They inhabited the Lješanska nahija region of Old Montenegro, being centered in the area around the village of Goljemadi, west of modern Podgorica.

Their name is a compound of the Albanian words gojë (meaning 'mouth') and madh (meaning 'big'). The name indicates the retention of the letter l in the word gojë. The Gojëmadhi are first mentioned around western Montenegro in the year 1402.

In the 1416-17 Venetian cadastre of Shkodra, mentions a certain Benk Goljamadhi inhabiting the village of Shirq near Dajç, Shkodër. Mariano Bolizza in his voyage in the area in 1614 recorded that Belo Vujkov held 27 houses of the Golemadi, with 57 soldiers.

Over time they were integrated into the neighbouring Slavic population. The village bearing their name still exists to this day.
