= Armed priests =

Military combatants

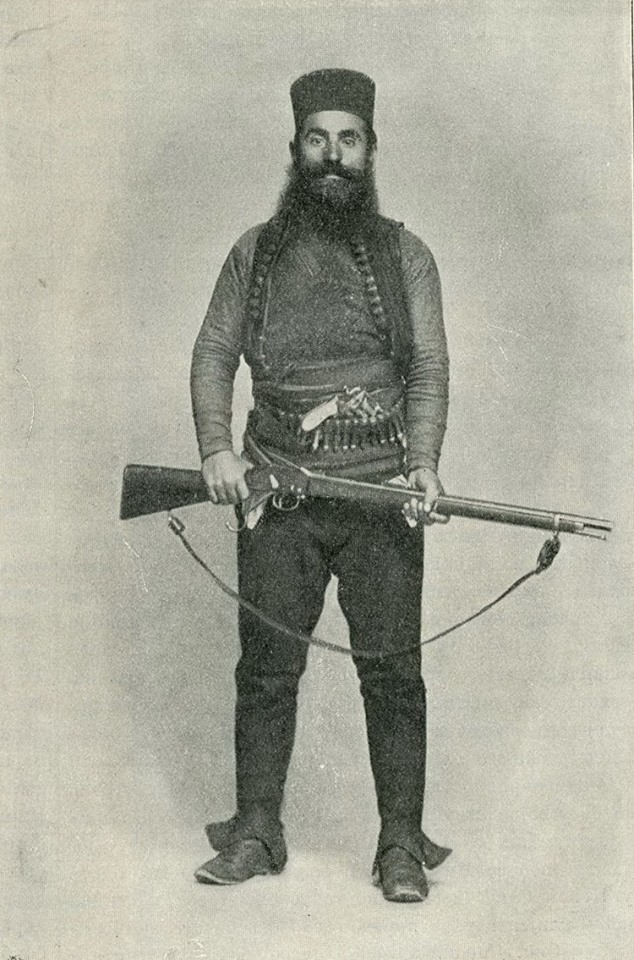
Serbian Orthodox archpriest Vukajlo Božović was a guerilla leader in the Kosovo Vilayet.

Throughout history, armed priests or soldier priests have been recorded. Distinguished from military chaplains, who are non-combatants that provided spiritual guidance to service personnel and associated civilians, these priests took up arms and fought in conflicts as combatants. The term warrior priests or war priests is usually used for armed priests in Antiquity and the Middle Ages, and of historical tribes.

== History ==
In Greek mythology, the Curetes were identified as armed priests. In Ancient Rome, the Salii were an order of armed priests who carried sacred shields through the city during the March festivals. Livy (59 BC–17 AD) mentions armati sacerdotes (armed priests).

Medieval European canon law said that a priest could not be a soldier, and vice versa. Priests were allowed on the battlefield as chaplains, and could only defend themselves with clubs.

The Aztecs had a vanguard of warrior priests who carried deity banners and made sacrifices on the battlefield.

In more recent times, the warrior priest was a common figure in the First Serbian Uprising (1804–13). Several archpriests and priests were commanders in the revolt, while Serbian Orthodox monasteries sent monks to join the Serbian Army. At least 120 priests and monks fought as soldiers in the uprising.

== Legacy ==
The Pyrrhic Dance in Crete is said to have been the ritual dance of the Korybantes, deities described as armed priests.

== Notable groups ==
- Chivalric military orders, Christian religious societies of knights of the Catholic Church in feudal Europe such as the Knights Templar, the Knights Hospitaller, the Teutonic Knights and many others.
- Naga Sadhus, a militaristic Hindu sect of arms-bearing sannyasi.
- Shaolin Monk, Ch’an Buddhist monks in feudal China
- Sōhei, Buddhist monks in feudal Japan
- Righteous armies, Korean guerrilla fighters including monks, who resisted the Japanese invasions of Korea (1592–98).
- Sant Sipāhī, the Sikh ideology of a saint-soldier inspired by the example Sikh gurus, where one lives in strict discipline of both mind and body.

== Notable people ==
Eastern Orthodoxy

- Alexander Peresvet (d. 1380), Russian Orthodox monk, duelled a Tatar warrior in battle with both killing each other.
- Pajsije Ristović (1790–1814), Serbian Orthodox hegumen, fought in the First Serbian Uprising.
- Melentije Nikšić (1780–1816), Serbian Orthodox hieromonk, commander in the First Serbian Uprising.
- Athanasios Diakos (1788–1821), Greek Orthodox priest, commander in the Greek War of Independence.
- Melentije Stevanović (1766–1824), Serbian Orthodox archimandrite, commander in the First Serbian Uprising.
- Samuilo Jakovljević (1760–1825), Serbian Orthodox hieromonk, commander in the First Serbian Uprising.
- Melentije Pavlović (1776–1833), Serbian Orthodox hegumen, fought in the Second Serbian Uprising.
- Luka Lazarević (1774–1852), Serbian Orthodox priest, vojvoda (general) in the First Serbian Uprising.
- Matija Nenadović (1777–1854), Serbian Orthodox archpriest, commander in the First Serbian Uprising and later first Prime Minister of Serbia.
- Mićo Ljubibratić (1839–1889), Serbian Orthodox priest, vojovoda who fought in the Herzegovina Uprising.
- Nićifor Dučić (1832–1900), Serbian Orthodox priest, fought in the 1852–62 Herzegovina Uprising and 1876–78 wars.
- Bogdan Zimonjić (1813–1909), Serbian Orthodox priest, fought in the 1852–62 and 1875–78 Herzegovina uprisings.
- Sava Dečanac (1831–1913), Serbian Orthodox priest, fought in the 1876–78 wars.
- Jovan Grković-Gapon (1879–1912), Serbian Orthodox priest, guerrilla in Macedonia.
- Mihailo Dožić (1848–1914), Serbian Orthodox priest, guerrilla in Potarje (1875–78).
- Tasa Konević (d. 1916), Serbian Orthodox priest, guerrilla in Macedonia.
- Vukajlo Božović (d. 1926), Serbian Orthodox archpriest, fought in the Balkan Wars.
- Stevan Dimitrijević (1866–1953), Serbian Orthodox priest, guerrilla in Macedonia (fl. 1904).
- Vlada Zečević (1903–1970), Serbian Orthodox priest, Yugoslav Partisan.
- Momčilo Đujić (1907–1999), Serbian Orthodox priest, Chetnik in World War II.
- Dimitrios Holevas (1907–2001), Greek Orthodox protopresbyter, a fighter in the Greek Resistance in World War II.
- Germanos Dimakos (1912–2004), Greek Orthodox priest, a fighter in the Greek Resistance in World War II.

Catholicism

- Archbishop Turpin (d. 800), legendary (insofar as military accomplishments) member of Charlemagne's Twelve Peers.
- St. Heahmund (d. 871), Bishop of Sherborne, died at the Battle of Meretun under Aethelred I of Wessex against the Great Heathen Army.
- Cresconius, (c. 1036–1066), Bishop of Iria, fought Viking raiders.
- Odo of Bayeux (d. 1097), Bishop of Bayeux, half-brother of William the Conqueror.
- Rudolf of Zähringen (1135–1191), Catholic bishop, Crusader.
- Absalon (1128–1201), Catholic archbishop, Crusader.
- Joscius (d. 1202), Catholic archbishop, Crusader.
- Reginald of Bar (fl. 1182–1216), Catholic bishop, Crusader.
- Aubrey of Reims (fl. 1207–1218), Catholic archbishop, Crusader.
- Arnaud Amalric (d. 1225), Cistercian abbott, Crusader.
- Pope Julius II (1443–1513), Catholic Pope who was famously known as the "Warrior Pope," and physically led his troops and was in battle during the Siege of Mirandola (1511), during the War of the League of Cambrai.
- Bernardino de Escalante (1537 – after 1605), Catholic priest, fought in the Battle of Saint-Quentin of the Italian Wars.
- Luka Ibrišimović (1620–1698), Franciscan monk, Croatian spy and anti-Ottoman fighter in Great Turkish War.
- St. John of Capistrano (1386–1486), Catholic priest and Franciscan friar, fought under John Hunyadi in the Siege of Belgrade of the Hungarian–Ottoman Wars.
- Marko Mesić (c. 1640–1713) Croatian priest and anti-Ottoman fighter in the Great Turkish War.
- John Murphy (1753 – c. 2 July 1798), Irish Catholic priest, a leader of the Irish Rebellion of 1798 captured, tortured and executed by British forces.
- Jerónimo Merino (1769–1844) Catholic priest, a Spanish guerrilla commander during the Peninsular War.
- José María Morelos (1765–1815), Catholic priest, a commander and politician in the Mexican War of Independence.
- José Félix Aldao (1785–1845), Dominican friar, general in the Argentine War.
- Antanas Mackevičius (1828–1863), Lithuanian Catholic priest, a commander in the Uprising of 1863.
- Stanisław Brzóska (1832–1865), Polish Catholic priest, head chaplain and a general in the January Uprising.
- Georges Thierry d'Argenlieu (1889–1964), Catholic priest and Discalced Carmelite friar, French naval officer and admiral. French High Commissioner in the Far East after World War II who set in motion the First Indochina War.
- Camilo Torres Restrepo (1929–1966), Catholic priest, Colombian socialist guerrilla.
- Gaspar García Laviana (1941–1978), Catholic priest, inspired by Liberation theology to be a guerrilla in the Sandinista Revolution.

Anglicanism

- James Kilbourne (1770–1850), Episcopal priest, volunteer colonel during the War of 1812 and later politician.
- Leonidas Polk (1806–1864), Episcopal Bishop of Louisiana, Confederate General and United States Military Academy graduate.
- William N. Pendleton (1809–1883), Episcopal priest, Confederate General and United States Military Academy graduate.
- Charles Todd Quintard (1824–1898), Episcopal Bishop of Tennessee, chaplain and surgeon for the Confederate Army.

Other

- The tlatoani, ruler of Nahuatl pre-Hispanic states, were high priests and military commanders.
- Dutty Boukman (d. 1791), Vodou oungan (male priest), a leader of the Maroons and in the Haitian Revolution.

== See also ==
- Religious war
- Sacred king
- Warrior monk
- Church soldiers

== Sources ==
- Milićević, Milan Đ. (1888). Поменик знаменитих људи у српског народа новијега доба. Издање Чупићеве задужбине.
- Srejović, Dragoslav; Gavrilović, Slavko; Ćirković, Sima M. (1983). Istorija srpskog naroda: knj. Od Berlinskog kongresa do Ujedinjenja 1878-1918. Srpska književna zadruga.
- Király, Béla K.; Rothenberg, Gunther E. (1982). War and Society in East Central Europe: The first Serbian uprising 1804-1813. Brooklyn College Press. ISBN 978-0-930888-15-2.
