= Vasilije Veselinović =

Vasilije Veselinović (Serbian: Василије Веселиновић; latter part of the seventeenth and first half of the eighteenth century) was an archimandrite (abbot) who spent years outside of Serbia collecting contributions for Studenica monastery in Serbia from wealthy Serbs living in neighbouring empires. During the hardships and misfortunes that befell the monastery in the 17th and 18th centuries forced some of the monks, including archimandrite Vasilije, to leave the place and seek assistance from wealthy patrons in neighbouring territories of Austria, Hungary, Wallachia (Romania), and Imperial Russia. As early as 1663 Tsar Alexei Mikhailovich allowed Serbian monks to come to Russia "once every five years to collect contributions towards the monastery upkeep." This was how Studenica was able to preserve its art treasures to this day.

Veselinović's work saved the monastery from neglect and ruin during that critical period.
