= Mardarije Uskoković =

Serbian Orthodox bishop (1889–1935)

Saint Mardarije of Lješanska, Libertyville and All America
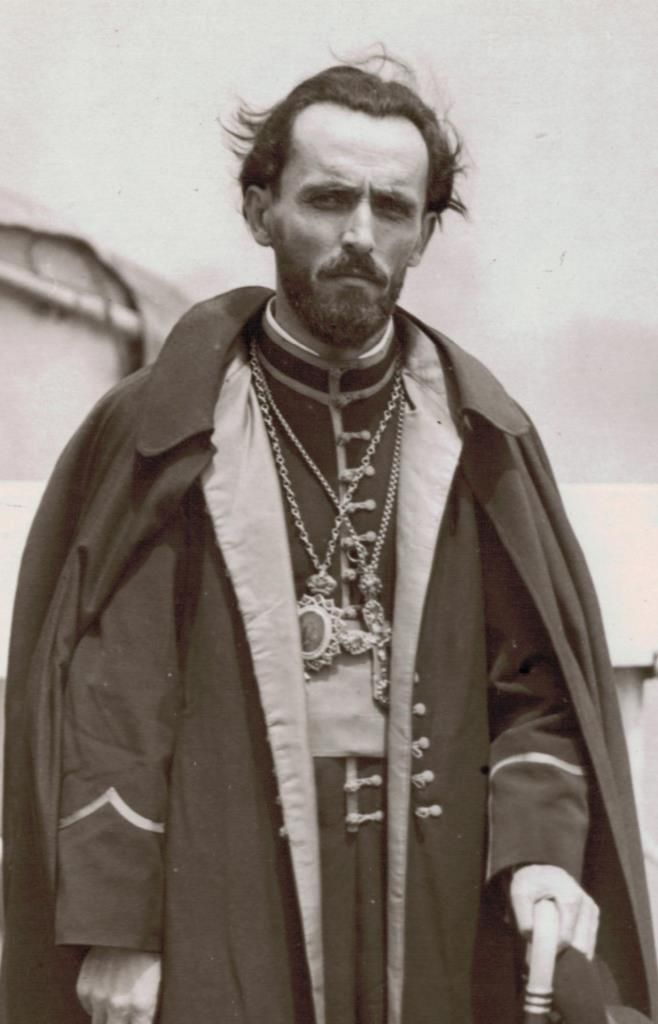
- Saint Mardarije in 1926

Bishop of America and Canada, Venerable
- Born: 22 December 1889; Kornet, Montenegro
- Died: 12 December 1935 (aged 45); Ann Arbor, Michigan, United States
- Venerated in: Eastern Orthodox Church
- Canonized: 29 May 2015, Church of Saint Sava, Belgrade, Serbia by Holy Synod of the Serbian Orthodox Church
- Major shrine: Saint Sava Serbian Orthodox Monastery and Seminary
- Feast: 12 December

Bishop Mardarije (Serbian Cyrillic: Епископ Мардарије, secular name Ivan Uskoković, Serbian Cyrillic: Иван Ускоковић; 22 December 1889 – 12 December 1935) was bishop of the Serbian Orthodox Church, the first Serbian Orthodox Bishop in the Diocese of America and Canada. He was canonized as a saint during the regular session of the Holy Synod of the Serbian Orthodox Church in May 2015 as Saint Mardarije of Lješanska, Libertyville and All America.

== Life ==
Uskoković was born on 22 December 1889, in Podgorica, Montenegro, near the area of Kornet in the region of Lješanska nahija. His father Petar "Pero" was a tribal captain and mother Jelena "Jela" hailed from the famous Serbian Božović family.

Uskoković was baptized at the church in the village of St. George and given the name Ivan. Given that he came from a notable family, he was allowed to further his education, first attending primary school in Rijeka Crnojevića and secondary school (gymnasium) in Cetinje and then in Belgrade, Serbia.

He travelled to Studenica in 1905, where he was ordained a deacon and received the name Mardarije. He stayed in Studenica for a year and a half, after which he went to Moscow for further education. He spent the next twelve years in Russia. In September 1907, he continued his education at the Theological School in Zhytomyr in western Ukraine. He was seventeen then. After two school years, at his request in 1908 he went to the Chisinau Theological Seminary in capital Moldavia. In 1908, he became a hieromonk, and received the rank of sinđel in 1912. He finished the seminary in 1912.

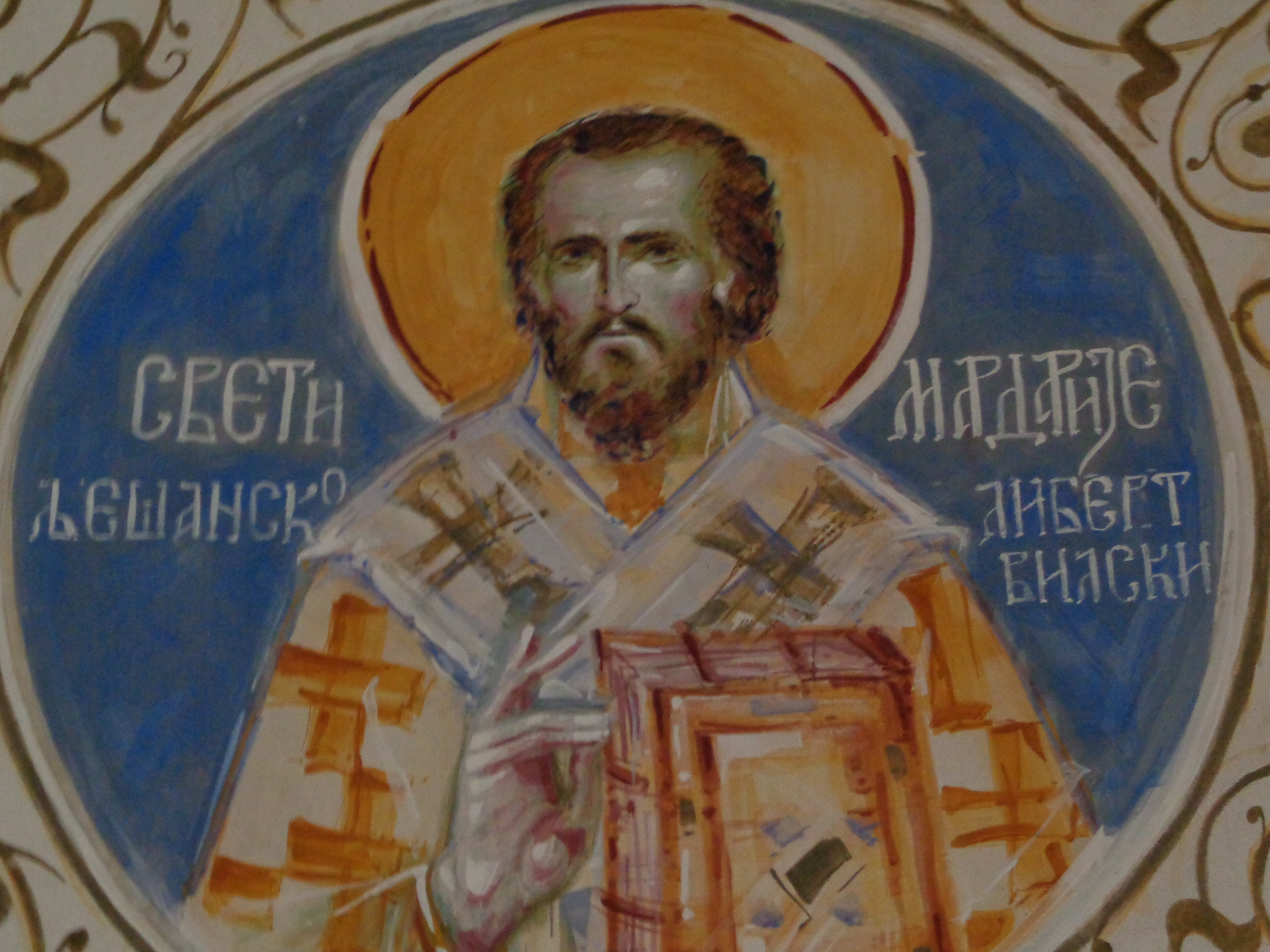
Fresco of Saint Mardarije in the chapel by the Church of St. Jovan Vladimir in Bar

He spent the next five years as a hieromonk in the Alexander Nevsky Lavra. He was admitted to the Saint Petersburg Theological Academy. Although he had one more year of study left, at the outbreak of World War I, he went to Niš to be with his people (Belgrade was under siege). He arrived on the first Sunday in August [1914]. and he first appeared to the Belgrade Metropolitan Dimitrije. The Metropolitan thought that it would be more useful for him to return to Russia.

After returning to Russia, he began a series of lectures on the All-Slavic unification, which was in direct contradiction with the then European policy. In the summer of 1915, he was entrusted with the mission of visiting prisoners of war on the river Volga, the mountain Ural, the Caucasus, and the Siberia. He inspired prisoners of Slovenian origin with Slavophile ideas. The clergyman Montenegrin Metropolitanate graduated in 1916 from the Petrograd Spiritual Academy. In the same city, he also studied church law at the Faculty of Law.

In 1917, he was sent to the United States by the Russian Orthodox Church to organize the Serbian Orthodox Church there. He served as head of the Serbian Mission, and at the All-Russian Council in 1919 in Cleveland he was elected Bishop. Not wanting to be ordained without the approval of his home church, he returned to his home country where he was appointed as the rector of the monastery Rakovice and the headmaster of the first monastic school in Serbia. He spent three years at the monastery, and he also gave lectures in the hall of the Serbian Academy of Arts and Sciences, at Universities, high schools, at the Faculty of Theology, and elsewhere. In 1923, he returned to America.

On 1 December 1923, he was appointed administrator of the Serbian American-Canadian bishopric, replacing Nikolaj Velimirović, who he had worked as an assistant for. Uskoković subsequently became the first bishop in the Diocese of North America and recognized as such by all Serbian Orthodox Bishops with the exception of Velimirović. That same year he bought a ten-acre property in Libertyville, Illinois near Chicago for $15,000 and built the St. Sava Monastery. In his will, Mardarije asked that the bishops of the Serbian church in America be enthroned there in the future.

The Holy Synod of Bishops of the Serbian Orthodox Church elected him bishop of the newly established diocese in America on 7 December 1925. His consecration took place on Palm Sunday on 25 April 1926. Because of his poor health, he could not travel to Belgrade to be present for the ceremony.

He died at the hospital in Ann Arbor, in Michigan on 12 December 1935. He was buried in the gate of the Saint Sava Monastery in Libertyville.

The relics of Saint Mardarije may also be venerated at the Greek Orthodox Church of Prophet Elias in Frankfurt, Germany.

== Works ==
- The Quiet Corner of Christ
- Anthology of Sermons
- A vow to the Russian people

== Notes ==
1. His date of birth is disputed, with some sources listing it as 2 November 1889.

== Sources ==
- Vuković, Sava (1998). History of the Serbian Orthodox Church in America and Canada, 1891–1941. Kalenić.
- Amfilohije; Jovanović, Ivana (2016). Sveti Mardarije lješansko-libertivilski i sveamerikanski – služba i akatist. Cetinje: Svetigora.
- Kostromin, Konstantin (2021). "The Holy spy". Saint Mardary Uskokovich during his studies at Petrograd theological academy (in Russian). Moscow: Vestnik Pravoslavnogo Sviato-Tikhonovskogo gumanitarnogo universiteta. Seriia II: Istoriia. Istoriia Russkoi Pravoslavnoi Tserkvi. Vol. 101. pp. 114–137.
- Kostromin, Konstantin; Puzović, Vladislav (2021). Saint Mardarije (Uskoković) as a student at Sankt Petersburg's Spiritual Academy (According to Academy's Archives) (in Serbian). Belgrade: University of Belgrade. pp. 5–22.

Eastern Orthodox Church titles
New diocese	Bishop of America and Canada; 1926–1935	Succeeded by Damaskin Grdanički
