= Semedraž =

- Village
- Location within Serbia
- Coordinates: 44°00′00″N 20°24′35″E
- Country: Serbia
- District: Moravica District
- Municipality: Gornji Milanovac

Population (2002)
  - Total: 264
- Time zone: UTC+1 (CET)
  - Summer (DST): UTC+2 (CEST)

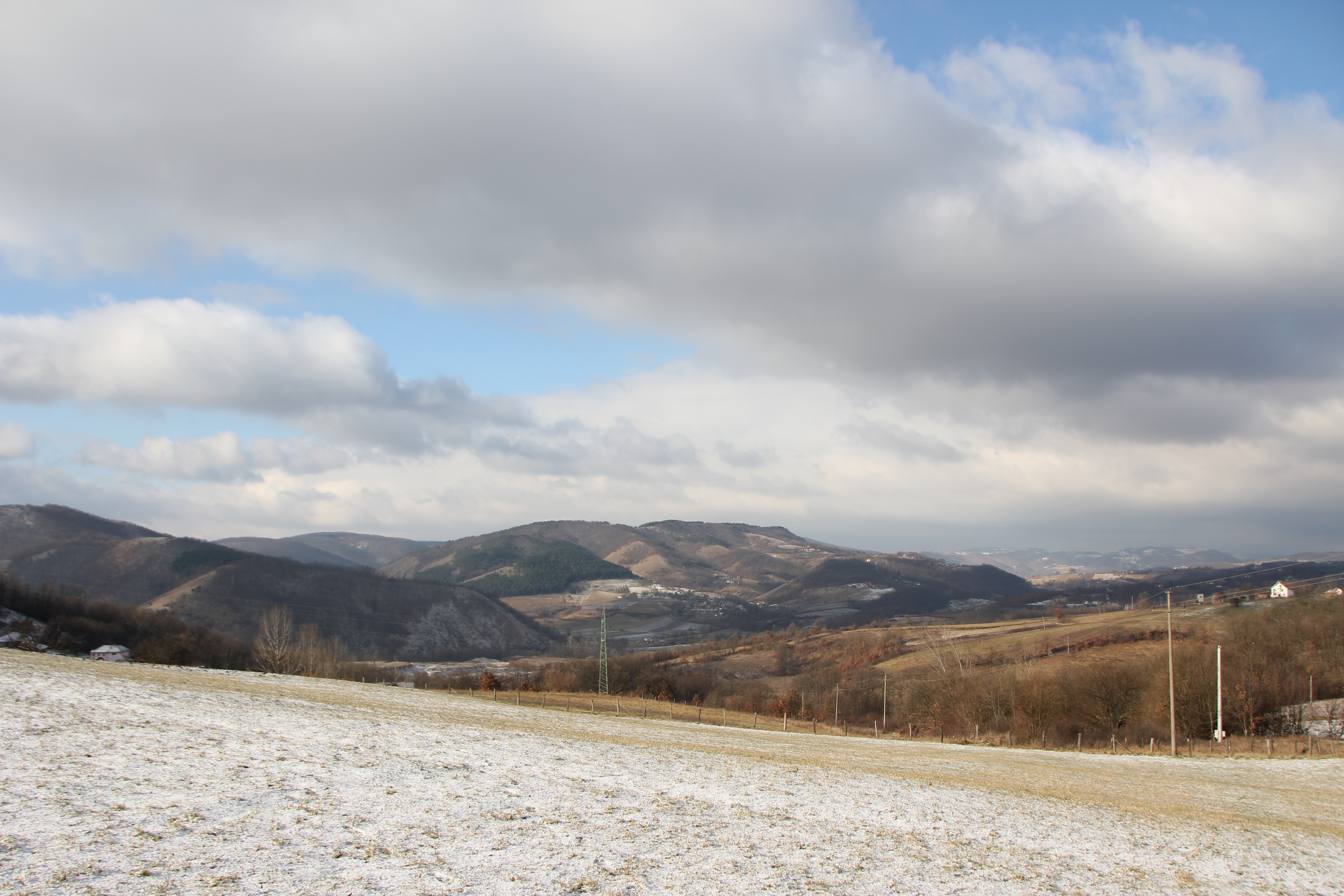
Village of Semedraž

Semedraž is a village in the municipality of Gornji Milanovac, Serbia. According to the 2002 census, the village has a population of 264 people.
