= Rufim Boljević =

- Metropolitan of Cetinje
- Metropolis: Metropolitanate of Cetinje
- See: Cetinje
- Installed: 1662
- Term ended: January 1685
- Predecessor: Mardarije Kornečanin
- Successor: Vasilije Veljekrajski

Personal details
- Born: Unknown Boljevići, Crmnica (modern Montenegro)
- Died: January 1685
- Denomination: Serbian Orthodox
- Residence: Cetinje

Rufim Boljević (Serbian Cyrillic: Руфим (Рувим) IV Бољевић; fl. 1662 – d. January 1685) was the Serbian Orthodox Metropolitan (vladika) of Cetinje from 1662 until his death in January 1685. Rufim Boljević is listed as Ruvim IV in church documents. He succeeded Mardarije Kornečanin (fl. 1640–59), and was succeeded by Vasilije Veljekrajski.

== Life ==
Boljević was from Crmnica, and belonged to the Plamenac brotherhood, and is scarcely mentioned as Rufim Plamenac (Руфим Пламенац).

It is generally believed he succeeded Mardarije Kornečanin, mentioned between 1640 and 1659. Mardarije was succeeded by Visarion II Kolinović from Ljubotinj as the acting metropolitan. His tenure was short, ending in 1662. Boljević is mentioned in sources from 1673, 1675, 1682 and 1685. He funded the construction of water reservoir in Hilandar before being ordained as Vladika. It has been theorized that it was Boljević who was mentioned in 1662 (by I. Stjepčević and P. Kovijančić). If he indeed had taken the seat in 1662, it means that he (as the Metropolitan) was one of two arbiters in the feud between harambaša Lazarić and Karučan from Crmnica, mentioned on November 2, 1662; as Boljević was from Crmnica, this has been taken as proof. It would also mean that he was active during the Cretan War (1645–69), in which many hajduks (brigands) from the region of Montenegro participated in, in the service of the Republic of Venice. A notable leader was Bajo Pivljanin.

After the Cretan War, he was an active protester against Catholic propaganda, famous for his conversion of Kuči Vojvode Lale Drekalov from Catholicism to orthodoxy. He had notable influence on the Montenegrin tribes, meeting with common folk and stopped blood revenge, and cursing evil-doers. He had been a staunch supporter of the Republic of Venice, and upon his death in January 1685, the Venetian Senate sent a letter to the Venetian governor of Kotor, expressing their "sorrow for the Metropolitan of Cetinje, who always showed interest in our service". He was the most loyal friend of Venice of his time. He was buried in Gornje Brčele monastery.

He was succeeded by Vasilije Veljekrajski, who is only mentioned by Nićifor Dučić, without a lifespan or service period.

A descendant of his, Arsenije Plamenac, also served as Metropolitan (1781–1784).

== See also ==
- List of Metropolitans of Montenegro

== Annotations ==
- Name: His name is mostly spelled Rufim Boljević (Руфим Бољевић), while his given name can be spelled as Ruvim (Рувим) as well.
