= Lještansko =

- Village (Selo)
- Location of Lještansko, Serbia
- Coordinates: 44°02′06″N 19°41′04″E
- Country: Serbia
- District: Šumadija
- Municipality: Bajina Bašta

Population (2002)
  - Total: 418
- Time zone: UTC+1 (CET)
  - Summer (DST): UTC+2 (CEST)

Lještansko (Serbian Cyrillic: Љештанско) is a village in the municipality of Bajina Bašta, Serbia. According to the 2002 census, the village has a population of 418 people.

== Demographics ==
Historical population
Year	Pop.	±%
1948	930	—
1953	943	+1.4%
1961	901	−4.5%
1971	837	−7.1%
1981	697	−16.7%
1991	519	−25.5%
2002	418	−19.5%
