= Melentije Nikšić =

Serbian bishop

Melentije Simeonović Nikšic (Brezova at Studenica, 1780 – Šabac, 16 June 1816) was the Serbian Orthodox Church bishop of Šabac and Užice during the Serbian Revolution of 1804. Bishop Melentije is mentioned among the renovators and restorers of the Serbian state.

Melentije was the son of Simeon Nikšić. He became a hieromonk in 1800. He distinguished himself in the First Serbian Uprising, and in 1813 he fled to Srem and lived as archimandrite for some time in the Fenek monastery, Vraćevšnica monastery and Studenica where he brought the golden cross with the scene of the Crucifixion, a gift of the Russian Emperor Alexander. Later, Prince Miloš Obrenović sent him and voivode Aksentije Miladinović as envoys on a mission to Constantinople, where he was consecrated bishop of Šabac. Melentije Nikšić was very proud and wrote about himself: "Bishop of Užice-Valjevo-Rudnik and Archbishop of Šabac". At the time, this was seen as a great success, a first Serb to be appointed to a See in Serbia proper since the time of the abolition of the Patriarchate of Peć in 1766. Prince Miloś was afraid of that respectable, rich and ambitious bishop, so Marko Štitarac had him killed under Miloš's instructions at a time when a coup d'état was being planned where Bishop Melentije, Petar Nikolajević Moler and others were implicated.

== See also ==
- List of Serbian Revolutionaries
- Armed priest
