= Pavlin Demski =

Catholic missionary in Montenegro

- Died: 1656
- Other name: Paulin Demski

Pavlin Demski or Paulin Demski was a seventeenth-century Catholic missionary whose activities focused on converting Eastern Orthodox Christians to Eastern Catholicism. In the middle of the seventeenth century, he was the central Catholic missionary in Montenegro. Demski was suitable person for propagation of the Eastern Catholicism also because he was from the territory whose people were already converted, so that this conversion could be used as an example.

== Missionary activities ==
Together with some other missionaries, Demski was sent by the Sacred Congregation for the Propagation of the Faith to convert Orthodox Serbs to Catholicism. Roman Curia appointed Demski as a teacher in schools which were planned to be opened on the territories populated by the Serbs. The Roman Curia carefully planned this mission and establishment of the Latin language schools planned to educate children of the pre-Ottoman Serb noble families as young Catholic priests. The first of such schools was planned to be opened in Peć, where Demski first headed to. Since Demski was afraid to travel to Peć while Serbian Patriarch was in Istanbul, in December 1649 he stopped his journey in Kotor where he opened the first such school. Based on the proposal of Frano Bolica and contrary to the objections of the local clergy, Roman Curia allowed Demski to hold services in the Church of Saint Luka in Kotor. In the autumn of 1654 Demski and his companions were attacked by the Ottomans while they were travelling from Kotor to Montenegrin hinterland.

Demski died at the beginning of 1656.

== Sources ==
- Jačov, Marko (1990). Srbi u mletačko-turskim ratovima u XVII veku. Sveti arhijerejski sinod Srpske pravoslavne crkve.
- patrijaršija (2007). Pravoslavlje. Izdaje Srpska patrijaršija.
- Ćorović, Vladimir (1997). Istorija srpskog naroda. eBook Portal. GGKEY:XPENWQLDTZF.
- Kostić, Lazo M. (1961). O srpskom karakteru Boke Kotorske. Sfairos.
- Udruženjе (1913). Srpski sveštenik: list Udruženja srpsko-pravoslavnog sveštenstva u Bosni i Hercegovini. Kosta Božić.
- Слијепчевић, Ђоко М (1978). Историја српске православне цркве. Ostrog.
- Bishop, of Šumadija, Sava (1996). Srpski jerarsi: od devetog do dvadesetog veka. Evro.
- SANU (1955). Posebna izdanja.
- zadruga (1993). Istorija srpskog naroda: knj. Srbi pod tuđinskom vlašđu, 1537-1699 (2 v.). Srpska književna zadruga. ISBN 9788637904762.
- Kalezić, Dimitrije M.; Berić, Dušan P. (1987). Sveti Vasilije Ostroški (Jovanović) u svome vremenu. Manastir Ostrog.
- Đurić, Vojislav J.; Ćirković, Sima M.; Korać, Vojislav R. (1990). Pećka Patrijaršija. Jugoslovenska revija. ISBN 9788674130575.
- Ostrog (1971). Sveti Vasilije Ostroški čudotvorac: spomenica povodom 300-godišnjice njegova predstavljenja. Uprava Manastira Ostroga.
- Стојановић, Добрила (1959). Уметнички вес у Србији. Музеј Примењене Уметности.
