= Lješanska nahija =

Lješanska nahija numbered 10 in this map of Old Montenegro.

Lješanska nahija (Serbian Cyrillic: Љешанска нахија) is a historical region in eastern Montenegro. It was a nahija (sub-district) of the Ottoman Empire. In the administration of the Principality of Montenegro, the nahija was part of Old Montenegro, alongside Katun, Rijeka and Crmnica. The Serbian Gradac Monastery was once located within the region.

Lješanska nahija included the area to the Riječka nahija, and was the most impoverished and smallest part of the Principality of Montenegro, consisting of several brotherhoods, which due to some differences among them (especially religious) could not in its entirety establish itself as other tribes. It was also home to the Albanian tribe of the Goljemadi.

The region was bordered by Lješkopolje, an Ottoman frontier which was not part of Montenegro prior to the Congress of Berlin (1878).

== Settlements ==
- Gradac
- Šteke
- Štitari
- Draževina
- Kornet
- Liješnje
- Orasi
- Relezi
- Podstrana
- Briđe
- Brežine
- Bigor
- Đalci
- Buronji
- Goljemadi
- Barutana
- Liješnje
- Donje Liješnje
- Begova Glavica
- Popratnica
- Staniselići

== History ==
According to a local tradition, after the Principality of Kastrioti fell to the Ottomans in 1444, Draško, the ancestor of the Vukčević brotherhood, fled with his three brothers from Lezhë to Zeta during the reign of Stefan Crnojević. After some time, the region inhabited by Draško's descendants came to be known as Draževina and all the villages inhabited by refugees from Lezhë received the common name Lješanska nahija, while the karst field adjacent to it came to be known as Lješkopolje (Field of Lezhë). As early as 1496 Đurađ Crnojević mentions the nobleman Radovan Lъšević (Lješević) in the area of Lješanska nahija, while its inhabitants as Lьšane (Lješane).

The name (Lješanska nahija) is first mentioned in 1692. Traditionally, Vojvodas (The Dukes) came from the House of Uskoković.

== Notable people ==
- Mardarije Kornečanin, Metropolitan of Cetinje (1637–59)
- Pavle Đurišić, leader of Montenegrin Chetniks in WW2
- Dejan Stojanović, Serbian poet, writer and essayist
- Stevan Raičković, Serbian poet, writer and academic
- Gojko Čelebić, Montenegrin writer and diplomat
- Vojislav Vukčević, Serbian politician and former minister of diaspora
- Sergej Ćetković, Montenegrin singer
- Simon Vukčević, Montenegrin footballer
- Marina Vukčević, Montenegrin handball player
- Dušan Vukčević, retired Serbian basketball player
- Dragiša Burzan, Montenegrin politician and diplomat
- Igor Burzanović, Montenegrin footballer
- Dragoljub Brnović, former Montenegrin footballer
- Branko Brnović, former Montenegrin footballer and current coach
- Bojan Brnović, Montenegrin footballer
- Nenad Brnović, Montenegrin footballer, brother of the above-mentioned Bojan
- Veljko Uskoković, retired Montenegrin water polo player

== See also ==
- Lješ (disambiguation)
