= List of metropolitans of Montenegro =

This article lists the Metropolitans of Montenegro, primates of the Serbian Orthodox Church in Montenegro, heads of the current Metropolitanate of Montenegro and the Littoral and their predecessors (bishops and metropolitans of Zeta and Cetinje), from 1219 to the present day.

== Bishops of Zeta ==
- Ilarion I (1219–1242)
- German I (1242–1250)
- Neofit (1250–1270)
- Jevstatije (1270–1279)
- Jovan (1279–1286)
- German II (1286–1292)
- Mihailo I (1293–1305)
- Andrija (1305–1319)
- Mihailo II (after 1319)

== Metropolitans of Zeta ==
- David I (1391–1396)
- Arsenije I (1396–1417)
- David II (1417–1435)
- Jeftimije (1434–1446)
- Teodosije (after 1446)
- Josif (1453)
- Visarion I (1482–1485)

== Metropolitans of Cetinje ==
- Pahomije I (1491–1493)
- Vavila (1493–1495)
- Roman (1496)
- German III (1496–1520)
- Pavle (1520–1530)
- Vasilie I (1530–1532)
- Romil I (1532–1540)
- Nikodim (1540)
- Ruvim I (1540–1550)
- Makarije (1550–1558)
- Dionisije (1558)
- Romil II (1558–1561)
- Ruvim II (1561–1569)
- Pahomije II (1569–1579)
- Gerasim (1575–1582)
- Venjamin (1582–1591)
- Nikanor I and Stefan (1591–1593)
- Ruvim III (1593–1636)
- Mardarije (1637–1659)
- Visarion II Kolinović (1659–1662)
- Ruvim IV (1662–1685)
- Vasilije II (1685)
- Visarion III Borilović Bajica (1685–1692)
- Sava I (1694–1697)

== Metropolitans of Montenegro ==
Primate	Portrait	Reign	Notes
Danilo I Данило I		1697–1735	
Sava II; Сава II		1735–1781	Co-served with Vasilije III from 1750 until 1766.
Vasilije III; Василије III		1750–1766	Co-served with Sava II.
Arsenije II; Арсеније II		1781–1784	
Petar I Петар I		1784–1830	Sanctified as St. Peter of Cetinje.
Petar II; Петар II		1830–1851	

== Metropolitans of Montenegro and Brda ==
Primate	Portrait	Reign	Notes
Nikanor II; Никанор II		1858–1860	Born in Drniš as Nikola Ivanović / Никола Ивановић.
Ilarion II; Иларион II		1860–1882	Born in Podgorica as Ilija Roganović / Илија Рогановић.
Visarion IV; Висарион IV		1882–1884	Born in Sveti Stefan as Vasilije Ljubiša / Василије Љубиша.
Mitrofan; Митрофан		1884–1920	Born in Glavati as Marko Ban / Марко Бан.

== Metropolitans of Montenegro and the Littoral ==
Primate	Portrait	Reign	Notes
Gavrilo; Гаврило		1920–1938	First metropolitan under the reunified Serbian Orthodox Church. Served as the 41st Serbian Patriarch. Born in Vrujci as Gavrilo Dožić / Гaврилo Дoжић.
Joanikije I Јоаникије		1940–1945	Executed by the Yugoslav Partisans at the end of World War II for collaboration with the occupying Axis powers. Sanctified as a hieromartyr. Born in Stoliv as Jovan Lipovac / Јован Липовац.
Arsenije III; Арсеније III		1947–1961	Born in Banatska Palanka as Svetislav Bradvarević / Светислав Брадваревић.
Danilo II; Данило II		1961–1990	Born in Drušići as Tomo Dajković / Томо Дајковић.
Amfilohije; Амфилохије		1990–2020	Born in Bare as Risto Radović / Ристо Радовић.
Joanikije II; Јоаникије		2021–present	Born in Velimlje as Jovan Mićović / Јован Мићовић.

== Timeline since 1858 ==
This is a graphical timeline of the metropolitans of Montenegro since 1858. They are listed in order of first assuming office.

The following chart lists the metropolitans by lifespan, with the years outside of their tenure in blue.

== See also ==
- Metropolitanate of Montenegro and the Littoral
- List of monarchs of Montenegro#Prince-Bishopric of Montenegro

== Sources ==
- Bataković, Dušan T., ed. (2005). Histoire du peuple serbe [History of the Serbian People] (in French). Lausanne: L’Age d’Homme. ISBN 9782825119587.
- Cattaruzza, Amaël; Michels, Patrick (2005). "Dualité orthodoxe au Monténégro". Balkanologie: Revue d'études pluridisciplinaires. 9 (1–2): 235–253.
- Ćirković, Sima (2004). The Serbs. Malden: Blackwell Publishing. ISBN 9781405142915.
- Džankić, Jelena (2016). "Religion and Identity in Montenegro". Monasticism in Eastern Europe and the Former Soviet Republics. London-New York: Routledge. pp. 110–129. ISBN 9781317391050.
- Fotić, Aleksandar (2008). "Serbian Orthodox Church". Encyclopedia of the Ottoman Empire. New York: Infobase Publishing. pp. 519–520. ISBN 9781438110257.
- Morrison, Kenneth (2009). Montenegro: A Modern History. London-New York: I.B.Tauris.
- Morrison, Kenneth; Čagorović, Nebojša (2014). "The Political Dynamics of Intra-Orthodox Conflict in Montenegro". Politicization of Religion, the Power of State, Nation, and Faith: The Case of Former Yugoslavia and its Successor States. New York: Palgrave Macmillan. pp. 151–170. doi:10.1057/9781137477866_7. ISBN 978-1-349-50339-1.
- Pavlovich, Paul (1989). The History of the Serbian Orthodox Church. Serbian Heritage Books. ISBN 9780969133124.
- Popović, Svetlana (2002). "The Serbian Episcopal sees in the thirteenth century". Старинар (51: 2001): 171–184.
- Sotirović, Vladislav B. (2011). "The Serbian Patriarchate of Peć in the Ottoman Empire: The First Phase (1557–94)". 25 (2): 143–169.
- Вуковић, Сава, ed. (1996). Српски јерарси од деветог до двадесетог века (Serbian Hierarchs from the 9th to the 20th Century). Евро, Унирекс, Каленић.
