= Visarion Ljubiša =

Montenegrin Orthodox bishop

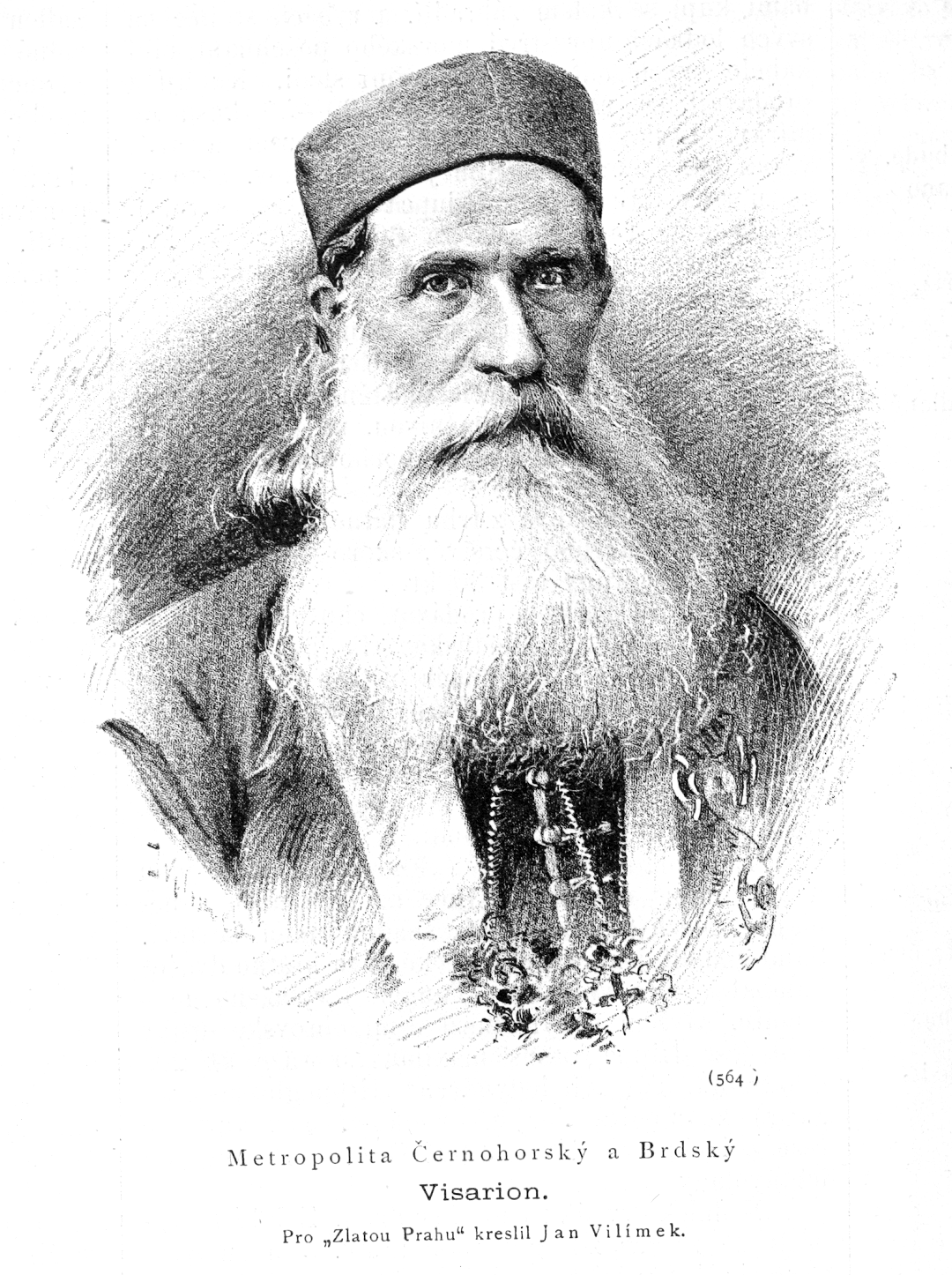
- Visarion Ljubiša (1884)
- Church: Serbian Orthodox Church
- Metropolis: Montenegro
- Installed: 6 December 1882
- Term ended: 14 April 1884
- Predecessor: Ilarion Roganović
- Successor: Mitrofan Ban

Personal details
- Born: Stefan Ljubiša; 28 February 1823 Sveti Stefan, Austrian Empire
- Died: 14 April 1884 (aged 61) Cetinje, Montenegro

1st Minister of Education and Ecclesiastical Affairs of Principality of Montenegro
- In office 1883 – 14 April 1884
- Monarch: Nicholas I
- Prime Minister: Božo Petrović-Njegoš
- Preceded by: Đuro Cerović (as Minister of Education but being too Minister of Finance)
- Succeeded by: Mitrofan Ban

Visarion Ljubiša (Serbian: Висарион Љубиша; 28 February 1823 – 14 April 1884) was the Serbian Orthodox metropolitan bishop of Montenegro from 1882 to 1884.

== Early life and schooling ==
Stefan Ljubiša was born in the village of Sveti Stefan to the Paštrovići clan. He lost his father, who was a sailor like many of his compatriots, when he was only three. When he reached school age, his mother sent him to his grandfather, Abbot Sava Ljubiša, at the Praskvica monastery. He completed his primary education in a lay school in Risan. The Praskvica brotherhood under the leadership of Sava Ljubiša sent Visarion in 1838 to study in Sebenico, and then in the next year Visarion entered the local newly founded Orthodox clerical school established by the Austrian government following Dalmatian bishop Josif Rajačić's queries.

Visarion was first cousin of famous writer Stjepan Mitrov Ljubiša.

== In the church ==
After he finished his studies in 1844, he returned to Praskvica, where he became a monk and was consecrated as a priest. Subsequently, he served as a teacher in monastery schools (often the only existing schools in those days) in Praskvica, Podlastva, Podmaine, Reževići Monastery, and Savina (all in the littoral). In 1858, he was appointed priest and teacher in Perast. In 1867, he became the abbot of monastery Morača in Montenegro and, two years later, the abbot of the Cetinje Monastery (which was the seat of metropolitan) and professor to the newly opened seminary. From 1872 to 1875 he was the rector of the Cetinje Seminary. During the Montenegrin–Ottoman War (1876–1878), he was appointed as military priest attached to the general staff. His dignified and brave behavior made it to the folk epic song. In 1876, he became the president of the newly founded Red Cross of Montenegro. From 1878 to 1882, he was the head of the Zahumsko-Raška eparchy, founded in the newly liberated territories of Montenegro. His seat was in Ostrog Monastery which he enlarged. His work as bishop was devoted and thorough; especially important was that Ljubiša introduced pedant church administration that he knew well from his earlier work in the Littoral.

=== Metropolitan ===
After the death of Ilarion Roganović, and the administration of abbot Mitrofan Ban, on 6 December 1882, Ljubiša became the Metropolitan of Montenegro. About the same time, the Ministry of Education of Montenegro was formed and Ljubiša, as an experienced teacher and organizer, became its first administrator. He was also a member of the State Council. He died of tuberculosis in 1884 and was buried in the courtyard of Vlaška Church in Cetinje. He left his house on main street in Cetinje to the poor.
