= Vavila, Metropolitan of Zeta =

Metropolitan of Zeta

Vavila Вавила
- Metropolitan of Zeta (Cetinje)
- Vavila wearing a kalimavkion in a painting by the Vittore Carpaccio workshop commissioned by the Buća family of Kotor, c. 1506
- Metropolis: Zeta
- Diocese: Metropolitanate of Zeta
- See: Cetinje
- Installed: 1493
- Term ended: 1504
- Predecessor: Visarion
- Successor: Roman
- Other post: Vicar bishop (1485)

Personal details
- Died: 1520
- Denomination: Serbian Orthodox
- Residence: Cetinje

Prince-Bishop of Montenegro
- In office 1516–1520
- Preceded by: Đurađ Crnojević (as Lord of Zeta)
- Succeeded by: German II

Vavila (Anglicized: Vavil; Serbian Cyrillic: Вавила; fl. 1520, before 1485 – 1520) was the Metropolitan of Zeta from 1493 to 1504 and the first Prince-Bishop of Montenegro (vladika) from 1516 to his death in 1520. Prior to being named Metropolitan he was the vicar bishop of Zeta under his predecessors Visarion and Pahomije.

== Biography ==
The very first of the vladikas—who were elected for 180 years by clan chieftains and people on Montenegrin assembly (called "Zbor")—Vavila, had a relatively peaceful reign without many Ottoman incursions, devoting most of his time to the maintenance of the printing press in Obod.

The first mention of Vavila dates to January 4, 1485, in the charter issued by Ivan Crnojević (r. 1465–1490); the Old Cetinje Monastery was built in 1484–85, at which time the Metropolitan of Zeta was Visarion, while Vavila was mentioned as his vicar bishop (1485). In 1514, Zeta was separated from the Sanjak of Scutari and established as the separate Sanjak of Montenegro, under the rule of Skenderbeg Crnojević. In 1516, Vavila was elected as ruler of Montenegro by its clans. This event marked the foundation of the Prince-Bishopric of Montenegro.

Vavila succeeded Visarion, though it is not known when exactly this would have taken place, as the oldest found source mentions Vavila as such in 1494, where he was mentioned in the Cetinje Octoechos. In some certain catalogs, Vavila was also mentioned in the years 1493 and 1495.

Vavila blessed Hieromonk Makarije's Cetinje Octoechos, printed at the Crnojević printing house in 1494, in which he was mentioned as the Metropolitan of Zeta. In 1496, Prince Đurađ IV Crnojević of Zeta (r. 1489–1496) abdicated the rule to Stefan II Crnojević, an Ottoman vassal. Zeta then became part of the Sanjak of Scutari of the Ottoman Empire in 1499.

In 1504, Roman is mentioned as the Metropolitan of Zeta. In 1514, Zeta was separated from the Sanjak of Scutari and established as the separate Sanjak of Montenegro, under the rule of Skenderbeg Crnojević. In 1516, Vavila was elected as ruler of Montenegro by its clans. This event marked the foundation of the Prince-Bishopric of Montenegro.

After the departure of Đurađ Crnojević from Montenegro to Italy, Vavila spent the rest of his life in Cetinje while successfully preserving the people in the state of faith and freedom in which he received them.

After the departure of Đurađ Crnojević from Montenegro to Italy, His Holiness Metropolitan [Vavila] spent the rest of his life in Cetinje peacefully, not even prosecuting those subordinates [...] to restrain the wrath of the terrible sultan against himself, but even, flatteringly, strengthened [sic] them with spirit—so that they would not forget who they were and from whom they belonged, but to defend their people and their homeland from oppression and to represent them in every necessity and force. — A passage excerpt from Sima Milutinović Sarajlija's History of Montenegro (1835).^{[a]}

Vavila died in 1520, and he was succeeded as Prince-Bishop by German II.

== Notes ==
a. In the same source where the paragraph was excerpted from, future metropolitans like German II (1520–1530), Pavle (1530–1532), Nikodim (1540), and others were mentioned.
