= Ilarion Roganović =

Metropolitan of Montenegro

Ilarion
- Metropolitan of Montenegro and the Highlands
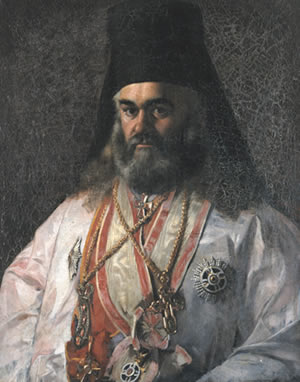
- Portrait of Metropolitan Ilarion by Vlaho Bukovac, 1880
- Native name: Иларион
- Diocese: Metropolitanate of Montenegro and the Highlands
- Installed: 5 August 1860
- Term ended: 15 January 1882
- Predecessor: Nikanor Ivanović
- Successor: Visarion Ljubiša

Orders
- Consecration: 23 May 1863 in the Russian Orthodox Church
- Rank: Metropolitan

Personal details
- Born: Ilija Roganović; 12 July 1828 Podgorica, Sanjak of Scutari, Ottoman Empire (now Montenegro)
- Died: 15 January 1882 (aged 53) Cetinje, Principality of Montenegro (now Montenegro)
- Buried: Vlah Church, Cetinje
- Denomination: Eastern Orthodoxy

Ilarion Roganović (Serbian Cyrillic: Иларион Рогановић; 12 July 1828 – 15 January 1882) was the Metropolitan of Montenegro and the Highlands from 1860 to 1882. Earlier, he was also the archimandrite of the Ždrebaonik, Ostrog and Cetinje Monasteries. He is remembered as the founder of the Committee of the Red Cross of Montenegro.

== Biography ==
=== Early life ===
Ilarion was born Ilija Roganović on 12 July 1828 in Podgorica to Đuro and Marija Roganović (née Marković). His family was poor, and he was taught by a local priest, Aleksije Radičević, and hieromonk Isaija Bajković who ordained him as a monk at Vranjina Monastery.

=== Service in the church ===
Metropolitan Petar II ordained him as a hierodeacon in 1843 and then as a hieromonk in 1847. After the death of Isaija Bajković, Ilarion became the abbot of Ždrebaonik Monastery near Danilovgrad. In 1856, he was called to Cetinje to study there, after which he became the abbot of Ostrog Monastery. From Ostrog, he moved to Cetinje Monastery where he became archimandrite, meaning he was de facto named successor to the Metropolitan.

On 5 August 1860, Prince Nikola named him the Metropolitan of Montenegro and the Highlands. On 14 October 1862, he requested Ilarion be consecrated in Russia, and his request was confirmed on 19 January 1863. Ilarion was consecrated on 23 May 1863 at the Alexander Nevsky Lavra in Saint Petersburg.

=== Death ===
He died on 15 January 1882, and was buried in the Vlah Church in Cetinje. He was succeeded by Visarion Ljubiša.

== Reforms ==
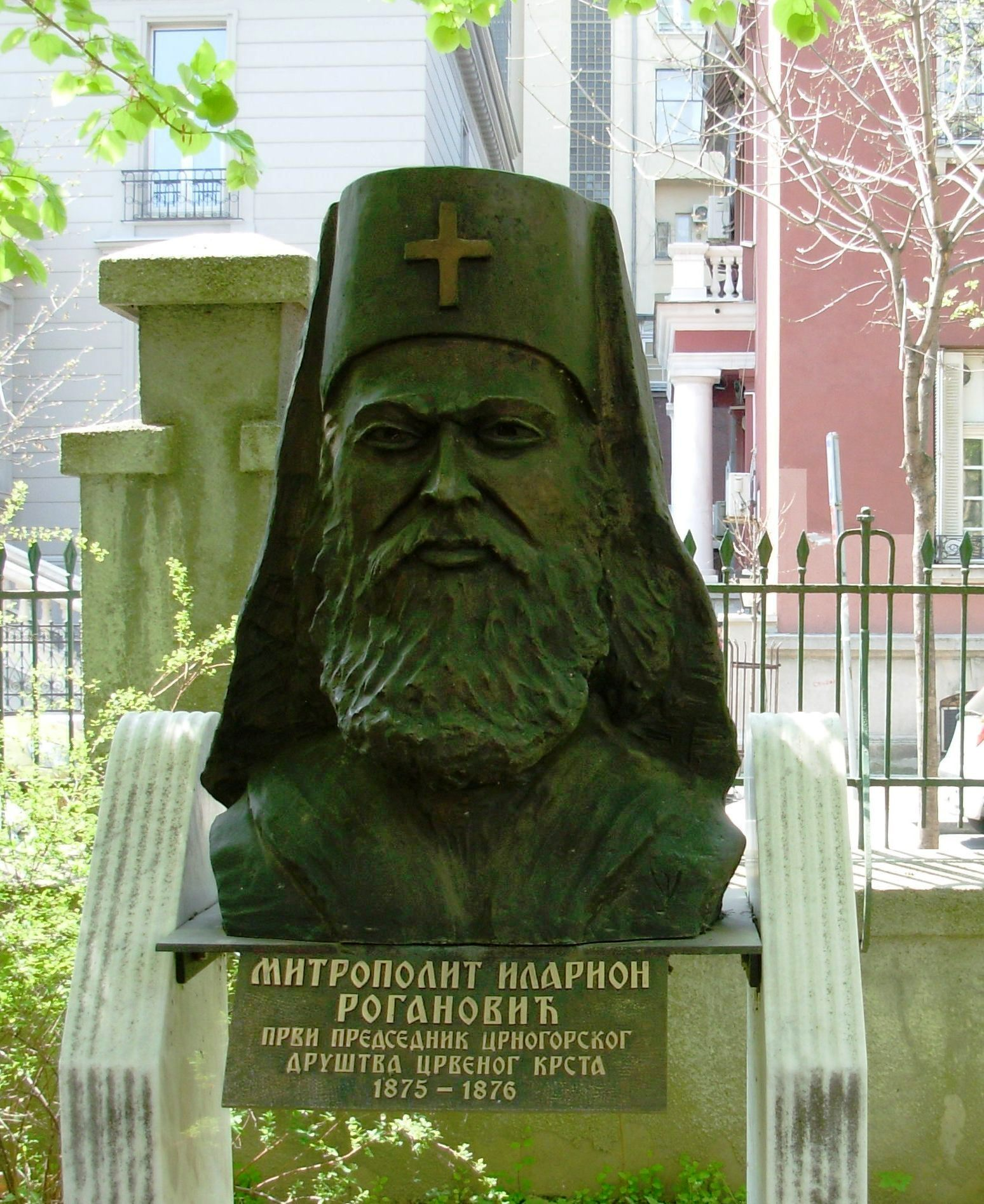
Bust of Ilarion Roganović in the courtyard of the Red Cross of Serbia

In 1864, Ilarion introduced an order that reformed the parishes and introduced archpriests. In 1866, parishes were reformed again making them more equal in population. After this, 60 priests were left without parishes, but were paid a yearly sum from parishes with more than 120 houses. Under Ilarion, an inventory of all monastery lands was created in 1868.

In 1866, Roganović ordered that all priests must grow their beards. They were, however, allowed to wear their national costume. Ilarion also introduced registers of births, deaths and marriages, expanding the earlier practice of recording only baptisms, started by Peter I.

Under Ilarion, the new Eparchy of Raška and Zahumlje was created. It covered the areas conquered by Montenegro in the Montenegrin–Ottoman War of 1878 and was led by Visarion Ljubiša, whom Ilarion and the Bishop of the Bay of Kotor Gerasim Petranović consecrated on 8 September 1878.

In 1869, the Cetinje Seminary was officially opened. During his service, Ilarion consecrated 45 temples and ordained 119 priests.

In 1875, Ilarion became the first president of the Red Cross of Montenegro.

Preceded by Nikanor Ivanović	Metropolitan of Montenegro and the Highlands; 1860–1882	Succeeded by Visarion Ljubiša
