= Sava Ljubiša =

Serbian Orthodox archimandrite

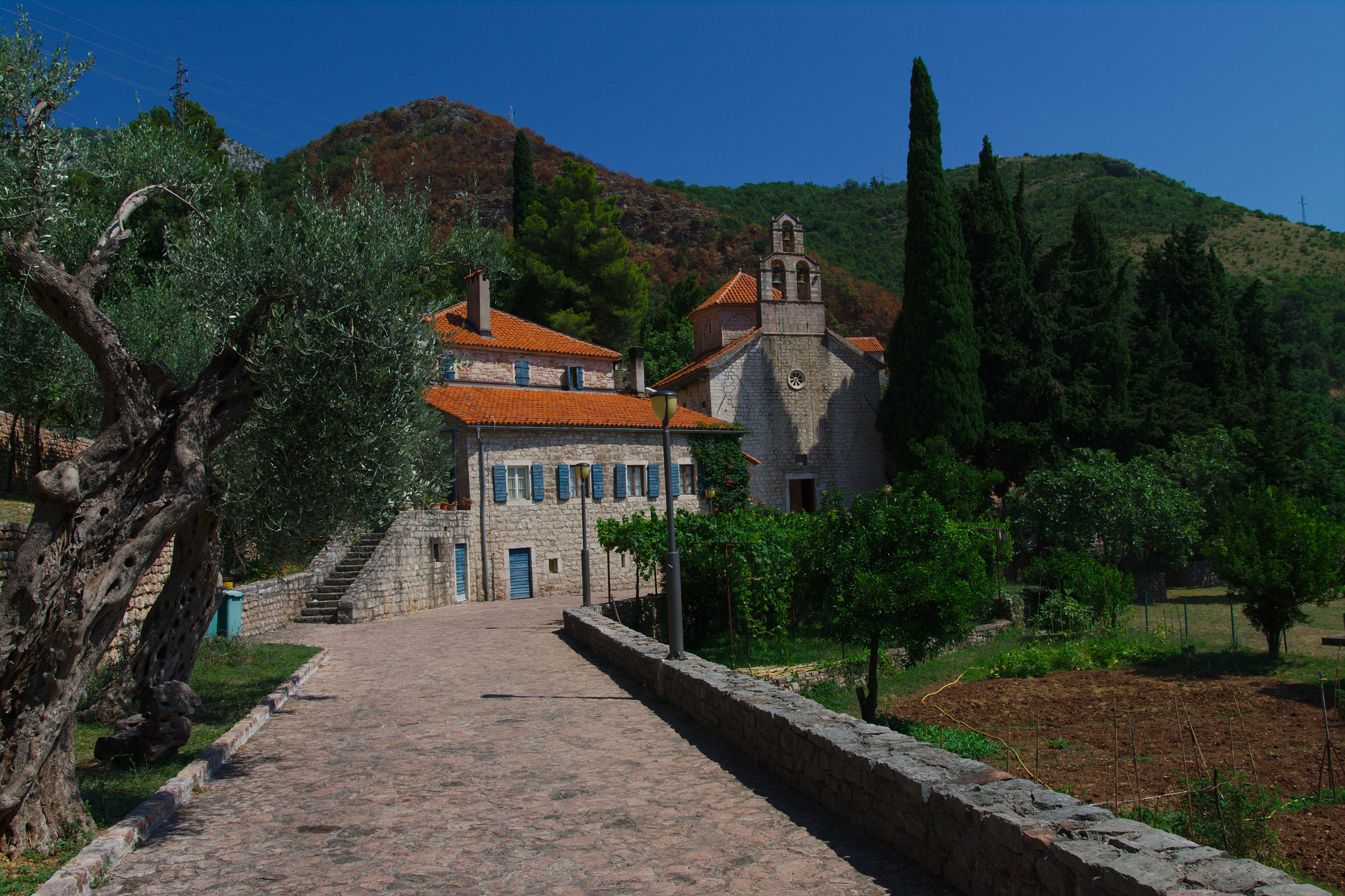
- Praskvica Monastery, where Sava Ljubiša served as archimandrite
- Born: Sava Ljubiša
- Died: 1842
- Other names: Savo Ljubiša
- Occupation(s): Serbian Orthodox archimandrite, envoy of Montenegrin Prince-Bishop Petar I
- Years active: fl. 1798–d. 1842
- Relatives: Visarion Ljubiša, Stefan Mitrov Ljubiša

Sava Ljubiša (Serbian: Сава Љубиша, fl. 1798–d. 1842) was a Serbian Orthodox archimandrite (priest-supervisor) of the Praskvica Monastery and a delegate and envoy of Montenegrin Prince-Bishop Petar I (s. 1784–1830).

Ljubiša travelled to Russia and presented the project of "kingdom of Old Rascia" in 1798, continuing on the project of Metropolitan Vasilije Petrović in which the restoration of the medieval Serbian state included territories in the Balkans and southern Habsburg Monarchy. The project was also discussed with Greek bishops. He also received donations from the Russian government for his monastery and brought back books from his many trips to St. Petersburg. In the 1802 rebellion in the Bay of Kotor the French looted the Praskvica monastery which they held as a rebel center and sentenced to death and executed two of the monks, Petronije and Dimitrije, the latter which was Ljubiša's nephew. The monastery was burnt down and Ljubiša saved himself by fleeing with the monastery treasury. His relations with Russia alarmed the Republic of Venice, which imprisoned him for a while in a dungeon, then put him in house arrest at the Krupa Monastery in Venetian Dalmatia, where he was held for four years. He had not committed any crime against Venice.

Among Ljubiša's relatives are Visarion Ljubiša (1823–1884), the Metropolitan of Montenegro (1882–84) and Serbian writer and politician Stefan Mitrov Ljubiša (1824–1878). The Praskvica brotherhood under the leadership of Sava Ljubiša sent Visarion in 1838 to study in Sebenico, and then in the next year Visarion entered the local newly founded Orthodox clerical school established by the Austrian government following Dalmatian bishop Josif Rajačić's queries.

== See also ==
- Gerasim Zelić (1752–1828), Serbian Orthodox archimandrite

== Sources ==
- Martinović, Dušan J. (1989). Skriptoriji i manastirske biblioteke u Crnoj Gori: zbornik radova sa naučnog skupa na Cetinju, održanog 26. i 27. oktobra 1987. godine. Centr. nar. biblioteka SR Crne Gore "Đurđe Crnojević". ISBN 978-86-7079-013-1.
- А. Пајевић (1887). "Mitropolit Crnogorski Visarion Ljubiša". Глас истине. 4.
- Bataković, Dušan T. (2006). "A Balkan-Style French Revolution? The 1804 Serbian Uprising in European Perspective". Balcanica (36).
- Georgievic, Mita (1878). Srpska Zora: ilustrovan list za zabavu i pouku. Vol. 6. Seidl.
- Medaković, Dejan (1971). Putevi srpskog baroka. Nolit.
