= Mihailo II, Bishop of Zeta =

Ninth bishop of Zeta

Mihailo II (Serbian Cyrillic: Михаило II) was the ninth bishop of the Serbian Orthodox Church's Eparchy of Zeta after 1319.

Mihailo II is mentioned in the charter of King Milutin, in which he confirmed the gifts of his mother to the Monastery of the Holy Virgin of Ratac, located on a cape between the present-day coastal town-fortresses of Bar and Sutomore was for more than two centuries an abbey dedicated to the Virgin Mary, known as Ratac or the Virgin of Ratac.

Mihailo is also mentioned in connection with King Milutin's stay in Kotor, as well as when issuing a charter to the manor of St. Stefan in Banjska. Sava, Bishop of Šumadija, in his book Srpski jerarsi mentions that Mihailo II was the bishop of Zeta between 1305 and 1309. However, Serbian historians Dušan Vuksan and Ilarion Ruvarac believe it was a decade or so later (after 1319).

== See also ==
- List of metropolitans of Montenegro
