= German II, Bishop of Zeta =

German II Герман II
- Bishop of Zeta
- Church: Serbian Orthodox Church
- Diocese: Eparchy of Zeta (1219–1346)
- See: Monastery of Holy Archangel Michael, Prevlaka, Montenegro
- Appointed: 1286
- Installed: 1286
- Term ended: 1292
- Predecessor: Jovan
- Successor: Mihailo I

Personal details
- Born: Unknown
- Died: Unknown
- Denomination: Serbian Orthodox

German II (Anglicized: Germanus II; Serbian Cyrillic: Герман II; r. 1286–12) was likely the sixth bishop of Zeta. He succeeded Jovan, Bishop of Zeta and Hum, the fifth bishop of the Eparchy of Zeta and an archbishop of Serbia, and preceded Mihailo I, the seventh bishop of the Eparchy of Zeta.

== Biography ==
Aside from being mentioned in the Pljevlja Synod of Orthodoxy as a bishop of Zeta There are very few mentions of Bishop German II. Other information about him doesn't exist. Coincidentially enough, German II is also one of the two bishops mentioned in the Pljevlja Synod of Orthodoxy, the other bishop being Andrew, the eighth bishop of Zeta.
