= Nikanor Ivanović =

Austrian bishop (1825–1894)

- Metropolitan of Montenegro and the Littoral
- Native name: Никанор Ивановић
- Church: Serbian Orthodox Church
- Metropolis: Montenegro and the Littoral
- In office: 1858 – 1860
- Predecessor: Petar II Petrović-Njegoš
- Successor: Ilarion Roganović

Personal details
- Born: 1825 Drniš, Kingdom of Dalmatia, Empire of Austria
- Died: 9 April 1894 (aged 68–69) Gorizia, Goritz, Austrian Littoral, Cisleithania, Austria-Hungary

Nikanor Ivanović (Serbian Cyrillic: Никанор Ивановић; 1825–1894) was Bishop of Cetinje and Metropolitan of Montenegro and the Highlands from 1858 to 1860.

== Biography ==
Nikanor Ivanović was born in Drniš, where his family came from Njeguši. He was, probably, taught theology in Zadar. There, before 1857, he was raised to the dignity of archimandrite. Then he stayed in Savina Monastery. In 1857, the Montenegrin prince Danilo I Petrović-Njegoš elected him as the secretary and vice chairman of the Montenegrin Senate, and then as the new Metropolitan of Montenegro and the Highlands. This office has been vacant since 1851, when Petar II Petrović-Njegoš, the last hierarch who combined metropolitan dignity with secular power in Montenegro, died. His successor Danilo I decided to change the existing system of state so that Montenegro could be recognized internationally as an independent country (claims to its territory were reported by the Ottoman Empire, claiming that the metropolitan princes only exercised spiritual authority). The decision was supported by the Russian Empire.

In 1860, Danilo I was assassinated in Kotor (then part of the Austrian Empire) and was buried in the Cetinje Monastery. Metropolitan Nikanor did not appear at his funeral, which resulted in his removal from office by the new Prince Nikola I. The hierarch went to Crimea, Russian Empire and from there to Italy. He died on 9 April 1894 in Gorizia, Austria-Hungary.

Preceded by Petar II Petrović-Njegoš	Metropolitan of Montenegro and the Highlands; 1858–1860	Succeeded by Ilarion Roganović
