= Mitrofan Ban =

Metropolitan of Montenegro

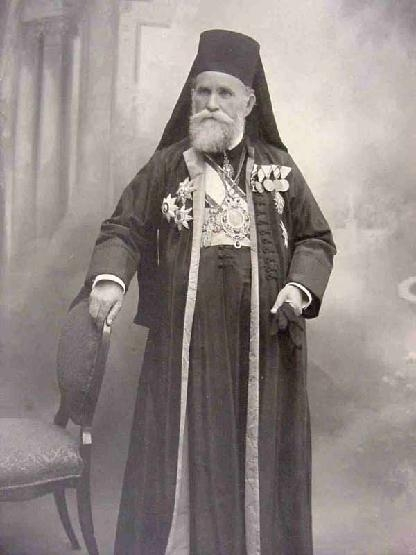
- Metropolitan Mitrofan (Ban) of Montenegro
- Church: Serbian Orthodox Church
- Metropolis: Metropolitanate of Montenegro
- Installed: 1884
- Term ended: 1920
- Predecessor: Visarion Ljubiša
- Successor: Gavrilo Dožić

Personal details
- Born: Marko Ban; March 15, 1841 Grbalj, Austrian Empire
- Died: September 30, 1920 (aged 79) Cetinje, Kingdom of Serbs, Croats and Slovenes

2nd Minister of Education and Ecclesiastical Affairs of the Principality of Montenegro
- In office 26 April 1884 – 3 October 1885
- Monarch: Nicholas I
- Prime Minister: Božo Petrović-Njegoš
- Preceded by: Visarion Ljubiša
- Succeeded by: Jovan Pavlović

Mitrofan Ban (Serbian Cyrillic: Митрофан Бан; May 15, 1841 – September 30, 1920) was Bishop of Cetinje, Metropolitan of Montenegro, and exarch of the Serbian Orthodox Church. He was also Archimandrite of the Cetinje monastery. He presided over the Holy Bishopric Synod (1919–1920) that unified the Serbian Orthodox Church in 1920.

== Life ==
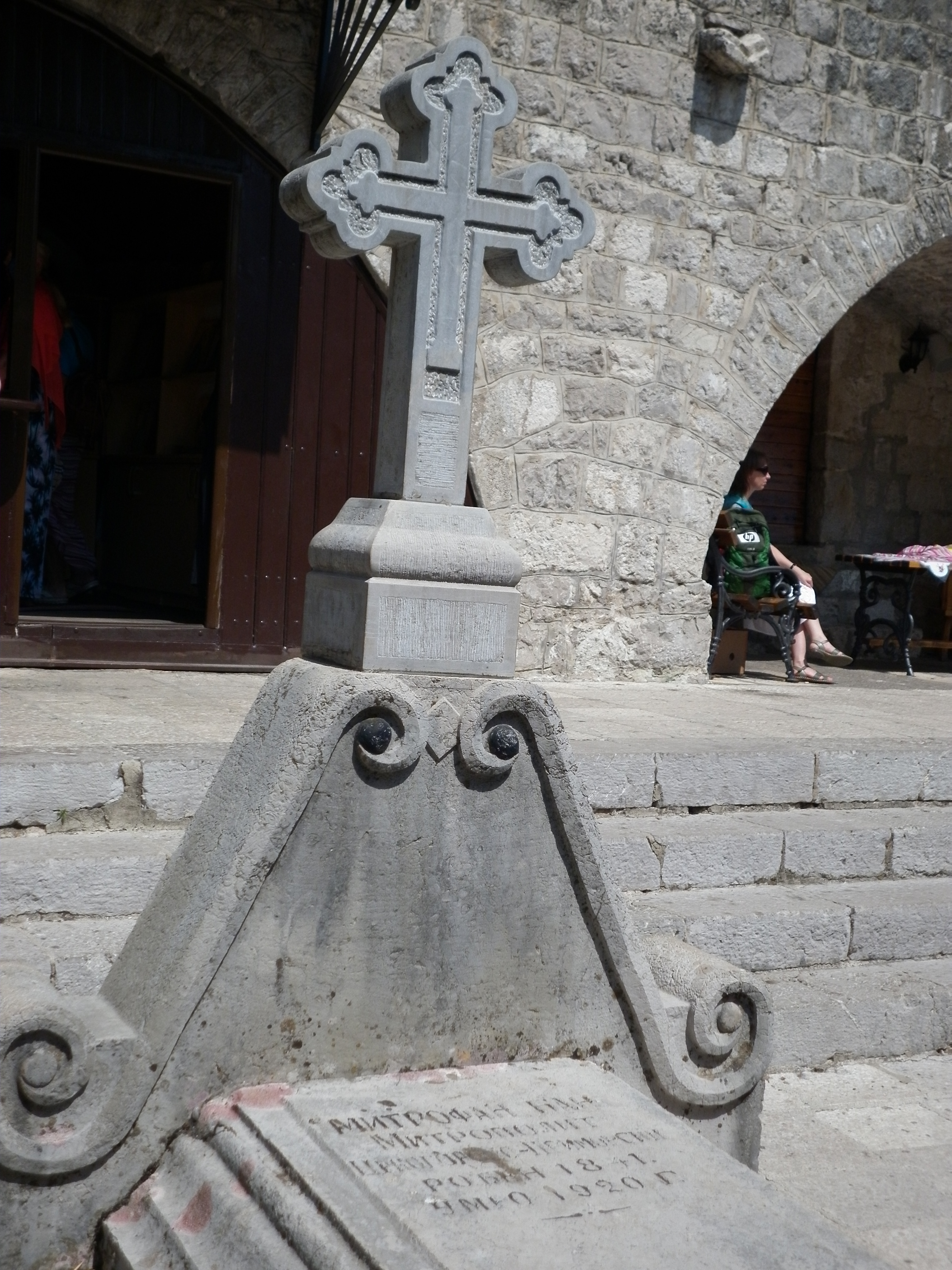
Mitrofan Ban's grave in Cetinje Monastery, Cetinje, Montenegro

Mitrofan Ban's birth name was Marko Ban, and he was born on May 15, 1841, in the village of Glavati in Grbalj region in the Austrian Empire, to Georgije and Anastasija Ban. He is related to writer Matija Ban of Petrovo Selo. He attended Serbian and Italian primary schools in Vranovići and Kotor. In 1865, he took his monastic vows in the Savina monastery near Herceg Novi. He was ordained a deacon by Bishop Stevan Knežević on June 27, 1865, and a presbyter on October 2, 1866. He became the nastojatelj (Serbian: настојатељ or nastojatelj) of Podlastva monastery in 1867 and of Morača monastery in 1869. From September 7, 1870 he was the hegumen (Serbian: игуман or iguman) of the latter. Both a nastojatelj and an iguman are the senior monk in a monastery; the difference is so slight they are sometimes considered synonyms.

He participated in the war against the Ottoman Empire from 1876 to 1878, for which Prince Nikola decorated him with the Medal of Obilić. He was ordained a Metropolitan on April 18, 1885 in Saint Petersburg. The ceremony was conducted in Saint Isaac's Cathedral by Metropolitan Isidor of St. Petersburg and other members of the Holy Synod of the Russian Orthodox Church, in the presence of Tsar Alexander III of the Russian Empire. Soon after, on September 5, 1884, the relics of Saint Arsenius (the second Serb archbishop) were ceremonially transferred from the Ždrebaonik monastery in Bjelopavlići to the Kosijerevo monastery.

After 1906, he was a member of the National Assembly of the Kingdom of Montenegro. He stayed in the country during the First World War occupation of the Kingdom by Austria-Hungary, and died on September 30, 1920, not long after the formation of the Kingdom of Serbs, Croats and Slovenes, and the reunification of the Serbian Orthodox Church, including the Metropolitanate of Montenegro and the Littoral.
