= Ruvim II =

Ruvim II Рувим II
- Metropolitan of Cetinje
- Metropolis: Cetinje
- Diocese: Metropolitanate of Cetinje
- See: Cetinje
- Installed: 1561
- Term ended: 1569
- Predecessor: Romil II
- Successor: Pahomije II

Personal details
- Denomination: Serbian Orthodox
- Residence: Cetinje

Ruvim II or Rufim II was a Metropolitan of Cetinje with a seat in the Metropolitanate of Montenegro and the Littoral, a diocese of the Serbian Orthodox Church. Ruvim II's tenure as Metropolitan of Cetinje is documented as being from 1561 to 1569.
