= Joanikije Lipovac =

Serbian saint

Saint Joanikije I Lipovac Јоаникије I Липовац
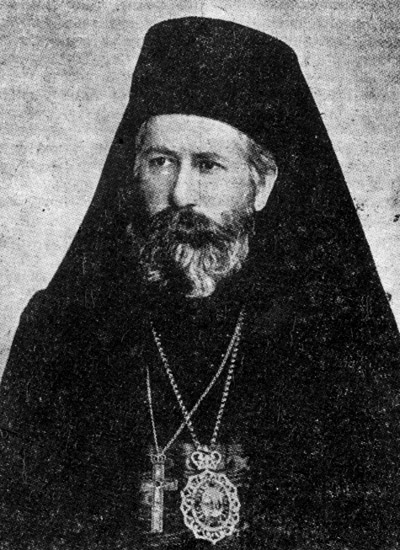

Metropolitan of Montenegro and the Littoral
- Church: Serbian Orthodox Church
- Diocese: Montenegro and the Littoral
- Installed: 1938
- Term ended: 1945
- Predecessor: Gavrilo
- Successor: Arsenije Bradvarević

Orders
- Rank: Metropolitan bishop

Personal details
- Born: Jovan Lipovac; February 16, 1890 Stoliv, Kingdom of Dalmatia, Austria-Hungary
- Died: June 18, 1945 (aged 55) Bukovik, Yugoslavia

Sainthood
- Canonized: 1999 by Serbian Orthodox Church

Joanikije Lipovac (16 February 1890 – 18 June 1945) was the Metropolitan of the Diocese of Montenegro and the Littoral. He was executed by the Communist-led Yugoslav Partisans for his collaboration with occupying Axis powers during World War II. He was posthumously canonized by the Serbian Orthodox Church.

Metropolitan Joanikije attempted to maintain the diocese as the area transitioned between German and communist rule. With the ascendancy of communist control he attempted to leave the area with a number of his priests. The attempt was unsuccessful and he and his party of priests were executed by the Partisans. In 1999, his name was added to the list of Serbian saints.

== Biography ==
Joanikije was born Jovan Lipovac to Špiro and Marija (née Damjanović) Lipovac in Stoliv in the Bay of Kotor in what was then the Kingdom of Dalmatia within Austria-Hungary. He finished elementary school in Prčanj and gymnasium in Kotor. He graduated in Orthodox theology in Zadar and philosophy at the University of Belgrade. After being ordained he served in Kotor and Lastva. From 1925 to 1940 he taught as a professor in Belgrade. In 1939 he was named an auxiliary bishop, with title Bishop of Budimlja. The following year he was named metropolitan of Montenegro and the Littoral.

Soon after taking the position of metropolitan, the April War brought the World War II to Yugoslavia and resulted in the establishment of the Italian governorate of Montenegro. Joanikije openly collaborated with occupying Axis forces and supported the activities of the Serbian Chetniks. He was at the head of the column of Montenegrin Chetniks which attempted to flee Yugoslavia through Germany at the end of the war. Joanikije was captured by Yugoslav Partisans on May 12 near Celje and taken to Zagreb. On orders from Milovan Đilas, he was transferred to Belgrade. He and his party were executed by the Partisans at Bukovik near Aranđelovac on 18 June 1945.
