= Mihailo I, Bishop of Zeta =

Seventh bishop of Zeta

Mihailo I (Serbian Cyrillic: Михаило I) was the seventh bishop of the Eparchy of Zeta from 1293 to 1305.

The Eparchy of Zeta was founded in 1219 by Saint Sava of the Nemanjić dynasty, the first Archbishop of the autocephalous Serbian Orthodox Church. After receiving the autocephaly from the Ecumenical Patriarchate of Constantinople and confirmation from the Byzantine Emperor, Archbishop Sava organized the area under his ecclesiastical jurisdiction into nine bishoprics. One of these was the Bishopric of Zeta, hence Eparchy of Zeta, then encompassing Montenegro and northern Albania. The seat of the bishop of Zeta was the Monastery of Saint Archangel Michael in Prevlaka, near Tivat. The first bishop of Zeta was Saint Sava's disciple Ilarion I (1220–1242). Mihailo I, Bishop of Zeta, was succeeded by Andrija (1305–1319), the eighth bishop of Zeta.

Mihailo was ordained a monk in 1271 in Zeta (Montenegro). He held the incumbency during the reign of King Stefan Uroš II Milutin.

== See also ==
- Ilarion I
- German I
- Neofit
- Jevstatije
- Jovan
- German II
