= Metropolitanate of Montenegro and the Littoral =

Diocese of the Serbian Orthodox Church

- Cathedral of the Resurrection of Christ, Podgorica

Location
- Territory: central and southern Montenegro
- Headquarters: Cetinje Monastery, Cetinje, Montenegro

Information
- Denomination: Eastern Orthodox
- Sui iuris church: Serbian Orthodox Church
- Established: 1219
- Cathedral: Cathedral of the Resurrection of Christ, Podgorica
- Language: Church Slavonic, Serbian

Current leadership
- Bishop: Joanikije Mićović

Map

Website
- Metropolitanate of Montenegro and the Littoral

The Metropolitanate of Montenegro and the Littoral (Serbian: Митрополија црногорско-приморска, romanized: Mitropolija crnogorsko-primorska) is a metropolitan diocese of the Serbian Orthodox Church covering southern and central regions of Montenegro.

The episcopal see is located at the Cathedral of the Resurrection of Christ in Podgorica. Its headquarters and bishop's residence are at the Cetinje Monastery in Cetinje.

== History ==
=== Eparchy of Zeta ===
The Serbian Archbishopric was established in 1219 by Saint Sava on which occasion the Eparchy of Zeta was established. The seat of the bishops of Zeta was the Monastery of Holy Archangel Michael in Prevlaka (near modern-day Tivat). The first bishop of Zeta was Saint Sava's disciple Ilarion (fl. 1219).

Upon the proclamation of the Serbian Patriarchate of Peć in 1346, the Bishopric of Zeta was among several eparchies elevated to the honorary rank of metropolitanate, by the decision of the state-church council, held in Skopje, and presided by the Serbian Emperor Stefan Dušan.

=== Metropolitanate of Zeta ===
After the dissolution of the Serbian Empire in 1371, the region of Zeta was ruled by the House of Balšići, and in 1421 it was integrated into the Serbian Despotate. During that period, the Republic of Venice gradually conquered coastal regions of Zeta, including cities of Kotor, Budva, Bar, and Ulcinj. Metropolitanate of Zeta was directly affected by the Venetian advance. In 1452, the Venetians destroyed the Monastery of Holy Archangel Michael in Prevlaka, in order to facilitate their plans for the gradual conversion of the Eastern Orthodox Christians from these parts of the coast into the Roman Catholic faith. After that, the seat of the metropolitanate moved several times, transferring between Saint Mark Monastery in Budva, the Monastery of Prečista Krajinska, Saint Nicholas Monastery on Vranjina (Lake Skadar), and Saint Nicholas Monastery in Obod (Rijeka Crnojevića). Finally, it was moved to Cetinje, in the region of Old Montenegro, where the Cetinje Monastery was built in 1484, by Prince Ivan Crnojević of Zeta.

Starting from the end of the 15th century, mountainous regions of Zeta became known as Crna Gora, meaning the Black Mountain, hence the Montenegro. In 1493, Prince Ivan's son and successor, Prince Đurađ Crnojević, opened a printing house in Cetinje, run by Hieromonk Makarije, and produced the first ever book to be printed among the South Slavs. It was the Cetinje Octoechos, a Serb-Slavonic translation of a service book from the original Greek, which remains in use in the daily cycle of services of the Orthodox Church. In 1496, entire Zeta, including Montenegro, fell to the Ottomans, but the metropolitanate survived.

=== Eparchy of Cetinje ===
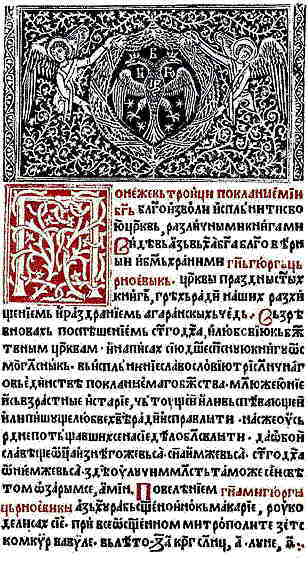
Cetinje Octoechos (1494)

After 1496, the Eparchy of Cetinje continued to exist under the new Ottoman rule. It had diocesan jurisdiction over Old Zeta, known now as Old Montenegro, keeping its seat in Cetinje. It had spiritual influence over the territory between Bjelopavlići plain and Podgorica to the Bojana. The eparchy also included some parts of Herzegovina, from Grahovo to Čevo. From 1557 to 1766, eparchy was under constant jurisdiction of the Serbian Patriarchate of Peć.

During the 16th and 17th centuries, the bishops and the local Christian leaders led armed resistance against the Ottomans on several occasions, with some degree of success. Though the Ottomans nominally ruled the Sanjak of Montenegro, the Montenegrin mountains were never completely conquered. The bishops and local leaders often allied themselves with the Republic of Venice. At the beginning of the 17th century, Montenegrins fought and won two important battles at Lješkopolje (1603 and 1613), under the leadership and command of metropolitan Rufim Njeguš. This was the first time that the metropolitan had led and defeated the Ottomans.

=== Metropolitanate of Montenegro ===
Entire territory of the metropolitanate was severely affected during the Morean War, and in 1692 the old Cetinje Monastery was devastated. In 1697, new metropolitan Danilo Petrović-Njegoš was elected, as first among several hierarchs from the Petrović-Njegoš family, who would hold the same post in succession up to 1851. Metropolitan Danilo was greatly respected, not only as a spiritual leader, but also as leader of the people. He combined in his hands both spiritual and secular power, thus establishing a form of "hierocracy". He became the first Prince-bishop of the Old Montenegro, and continued to oppose the Ottoman Empire, while maintaining traditional ties with Venice. He also established direct ties with the Russian Empire, seeking and receiving financial aid and political protection.

His successors continued the same policy. Metropolitans Sava II Petrović-Njegoš (1735–1750, 1766–1781) and Vasilije Petrović-Njegoš (1750–1766) had to balance between Ottomans, Venetians, and Russians. During that time, metropolitans of Cetinje continued to be ordained by the Serbian Patriarchs of Peć (until 1766), and later by the Serbian Metropolitans of Karlovci (until 1830). After brief tenure of Arsenije Plamenac (1781–1784), several new policies were introduced by Metropolitan Petar I Petrović-Njegoš (1784–1830), who initiated the unification process between the Old Montenegro and the region of Brda. The same process was completed by his successor Petar II Petrović-Njegoš (1830–1851), who received consecration from the Most Holy Synod of the Russian Orthodox Church in 1833, establishing a practice that lasted until 1885. As a reformer of state administration, Petar II made preparations for separation of spiritual and secular power, and upon his death such separation was implemented. His successors became Prince Danilo Petrović-Njegoš as a secular ruler, and metropolitan Nikanor Ivanović as a spiritual leader, new metropolitan of Montenegro.

=== Metropolitanate of Montenegro and Brda ===
The Metropolitanate of Montenegro and Brda was reorganized during the rule of Prince Danilo I (1852–1860), first secular ruler of the newly proclaimed Principality of Montenegro. Offices of ruling prince and metropolitan were separated, and diocesan administration was modernized. First metropolitan to be elected just as a church leader was Nikanor Ivanović in 1858. He was deposed and exiled in 1860 by new prince Nicholas (1860–1918), who established a firm state control over the church administration. During his long reign, metropolitans Ilarion Roganović (since 1863), and Visarion Ljubiša (since 1882) undertook some important reforms of church administration. In 1878, the Principality of Montenegro was recognized as an independent state, and it was also enlarged, by annexing Old Herzegovina and some other regions. Until that time, Eastern Orthodox Christians of the Old Herzegovina belonged to the Metropolitanatae of Herzegovina, centered in Mostar, still under the Ottoman rule. Such diocesan affiliation was no longer maintainable, and for the newly annexed regions a new bishopric was created, the Eparchy of Zachlumia and Raška, with seat in Nikšić. Since that time, there were two eparchies in Montenegro: the old Metropolitanate, still centered in Cetinje, and the newly created Eparchy of Zachlumia and Raška, with seat in Nikšić. No ecclesiastical province with joint church bodies was created until 1904, under the metropolitan Mitrofan Ban (1884–1920), when a Holy Synod was established, formally consisting of two bishops, but because of the long vacancy in Nikšić, it did not start to function until 1908.

During the long reign of Prince and (from 1910) King Nicholas, who was a Serb patriot, rising political aspirations of his government included not only the securing of the Serbian throne for his dynasty, but also the renewal of the old Serbian Patriarchate of Peć. On the occasion of the elevation of Montenegro to the rank of Kingdom, in 1910, the prime minister of Montenegro, Lazar Tomanović, stated: The Metropolitanate of Cetinje is the only Saint Sava's episcopal seat which has been preserved without interruption to this day, and as such it represents the lawful throne and a descendant of the Patriarchate of Peć. Such aspirations were strengthened after the liberation of Peć during the territorial expansion of Montenegro in 1912, when another eparchy was created for several annexed territories that until then belonged to the Eparchy of Raška and Prizren. Its regions annexed to Montenegro were reorganized as the new Eparchy of Peć (1913). From that time, the Holy Synod started to function in full capacity, with three bishops.

=== Metropolitanate of Montenegro and the Littoral ===
In 1918, following the end of the World War I, the Kingdom of Montenegro was united with the Kingdom of Serbia, by the proclamation of the newly-elected Podgorica Assembly, and only days later, the Kingdom of Serbs, Croats, and Slovenes was created, known after 1929 as the Kingdom of Yugoslavia. The political and national unification was carried out under the auspices of the Karađorđević dynasty, and thus a long-standing dynastic rivalry between the two royal families, the Petrović–Njegoš dynasty of Montenegro and the Karađorđević dynasty of Serbia, was finally resolved, without mutual agreement.

Political unification was followed by the unification of all Eastern Orthodox jurisdictions within the borders of the new state. Initial decision to include dioceses in Montenegro into the process of ecclesiastical unification was reached on 29 (16 o.s.) December 1918 by the Holy Synod, consisted of all three hierarchs in Montenegro: Mitrofan Ban of Cetinje, Kirilo Mitrović of Nikšić, and Gavrilo Dožić of Peć. On that day, the Holy Synod met in Cetinje and unanimously accepted the following proposal: "The independent Holy Serbian Orthodox Church in Montenegro shall be united with the autocephalous Orthodox Church in the Kingdom of Serbia". Soon after that, further steps towards ecclesiastical unification were made. From 24 to 28 May 1919, a conference of all Eastern Orthodox bishops within the borders of the unified state was held in Belgrade, and it was presided by metropolitan Mitrofan Ban of Montenegro, who was also elected president of the newly created Central Synod. Under his leadership, the Central Synod prepared the final proclamation of Church unification on 12 September 1920. The creation of the unified Serbian Orthodox Church was also confirmed by King Alexander I.

Old metropolitan Mitrofan Ban was succeeded in the autumn of 1920 by Gavrilo Dožić, who became new Metropolitan of Montenegro and the Littoral. In 1931, under the provisions of the newly adopted Constitution of the Serbian Orthodox Church, the Eparchy of Zachlumia and Raška with its seat in Nikšić was abolished, and its territory was added to the Metropolitanate of Montenegro and the Littoral. In the same time, the Eparchy of Kotor and Dubrovnik was also abolished, and divided, its Bay of Kotor region being added to the metropolitanate. In 1938, Metropolitan Gavrilo Dožić was elected Serbian Patriarch, and Joanikije Lipovac was elected new Metropolitan of Montenegro and the Littoral, in 1940.

During the World War II, Yugoslavia was occupied by Axis powers in 1941, and the territory of Montenegro was organized as the Italian governorate of Montenegro (1941–1943), followed by the German occupation of Montenegro (1943–1944). The metropolitanate was affected severely during the occupation, and more than hundred priests and other clergymen from the territory of Montenegro lost their lives during the war. During that time, Montenegrin fascist Sekula Drljević tried to create an independent Kingdom of Montenegro, as a satellite state of Fascist Italy and Nazi Germany, but that project failed because of the lack of support among people. His attempt was challenged by the uprising in 1941, which had support from both sides of the political spectrum. Metropolitan Joanikije Lipovac co-operated closely with several right-wing movements and also tried to mediate with local Italian and German officials in occupied Montenegro, thus provoking animosity of the left-wing Yugoslav Partisans. In 1944, when Yugoslav Communists took the power, he had to flee but was arrested and executed without trial in 1945. In 2001, he was sanctified as a hieromartyr by the Serbian Orthodox Church.

Under the Yugoslav Communist rule (1944–1989), the metropolitanate suffered constant repression at the hands of the new regime. Persecution was particularly severe during the first years of Communist rule. The new regime exerted direct pressure on the clergy in order to crush all forms of anti-communist opposition. Many church properties were confiscated, some under the provisions of new legislation, while other were taken illegally and forcefully. Several churches and even some minor monasteries were closed, and their buildings turned into police stations and warehouses. At the same time, policy of Montnenegrin ethnic identity, as distinctive and separate from Serbs, was pursued. In 1954, Metropolitan Arsenije Bradvarević (1947–1960) was arrested, tried, and sentenced as an enemy of the communist regime. He was imprisoned from 1954 to 1958, and then kept under house arrest until 1960. He was succeeded by Metropolitan Danilo Dajković (1961–1990), whose activities were also monitored closely by state authorities. In 1970–1972, the communist regime destroyed the Lovćen Church, dedicated to Saint Peter of Cetinje, and desecrated the tomb of metropolitan Petar II Petrović-Njegoš, who was buried there, replacing the church with a secular mausoleum.

In 1990, Amfilohije Radović was elected new Metropolitan of Montenegro and the Littoral. By that time, the communist regime in Yugoslavia was collapsing, and first democratic elections in Montenegro were held in 1990. In 1992, the Federal Republic of Yugoslavia was created, consisting of Montenegro and Serbia. Under the 1992 Constitution of Montenegro, freedom of religion was restored. Political changes were followed by a period of church revival. The number of priests, monks and nuns, as well as the number of the faithful, increased and many monasteries and parish churches were rebuilt and reopened. For example, from only 10 active monasteries with about 20 monks and nuns in 1991, it increased since then to 30 active monasteries with more than 160 monks and nuns nowadays. The number of parish priests also increased from 20 in 1991 to more than 60 today. In 2001, diocesan administration in the region was reorganized: some northeeastern and western regions were detached from the metropolitanate, on which territory Eparchy of Budimlja and Nikšić was established.

In 2006, the independence referendum was held, and Montenegro became an independent state. At the same time, the Council of Bishops of the Serbian Orthodox Church decided to form a regional Bishops Council for Montenegro, consisted of bishops representing dioceses on the territory of Montenegro. By the same decision, Metropolitan of Montenegro and the Littoral was appointed president of the regional Bishops Council. In 2007, due to illness and advanced age of Serbian Patriarch Pavle, the Holy Synod of the Serbian Orthodox Church appointed Metropolitan Amfilohije Radović administrator of the patriarchal throne, administering it until the election of new Serbian Patriarch Irinej in 2010.

Since Montenegro became an independent state in 2006, relations between state authorities and the metropolitanate became increasingly complex. As a strong supporter of Serbian-Montenegrin unionism, Metropolitan Amfilohije was seen as an opponent to Montenegrin independence, and thus a new political dimension to several ecclesiastical disputes was added. One of those disputes was related to claims and activities of a separate Montenegrin Orthodox Church, created in 1993 by a group of Montenegrin nationalists, but never recognized as canonical. During the following years, various disputes arose, mainly over the question of historical and canonical legitimacy and effective control over some church objects and properties. In 2019, relations with the state further deteriorated as authorities adopted a new legislation on religious organisations, which was interpreted by the Serbian Orthodox Church as aimed at potential confiscation of church properties. Prolonged mass clerical protests ensued in support for the Metropolitanate that lasted until the 2020 parliamentary election and the ruling Democratic Party of Socialists of Montenegro losing power.

In 2021, the new head of the diocese, Joanikije Mićović, was enthroned at the Cetinje Monastery by the Serbian Patriarch Porfirije. The Serbian Orthodox Church's intention to hold the ceremony at a historic monastery in the town of Cetinje, further exacerbated political and ethnic tensions in Montenegro and provoked violent protests in Cetinje.

== List of bishops ==
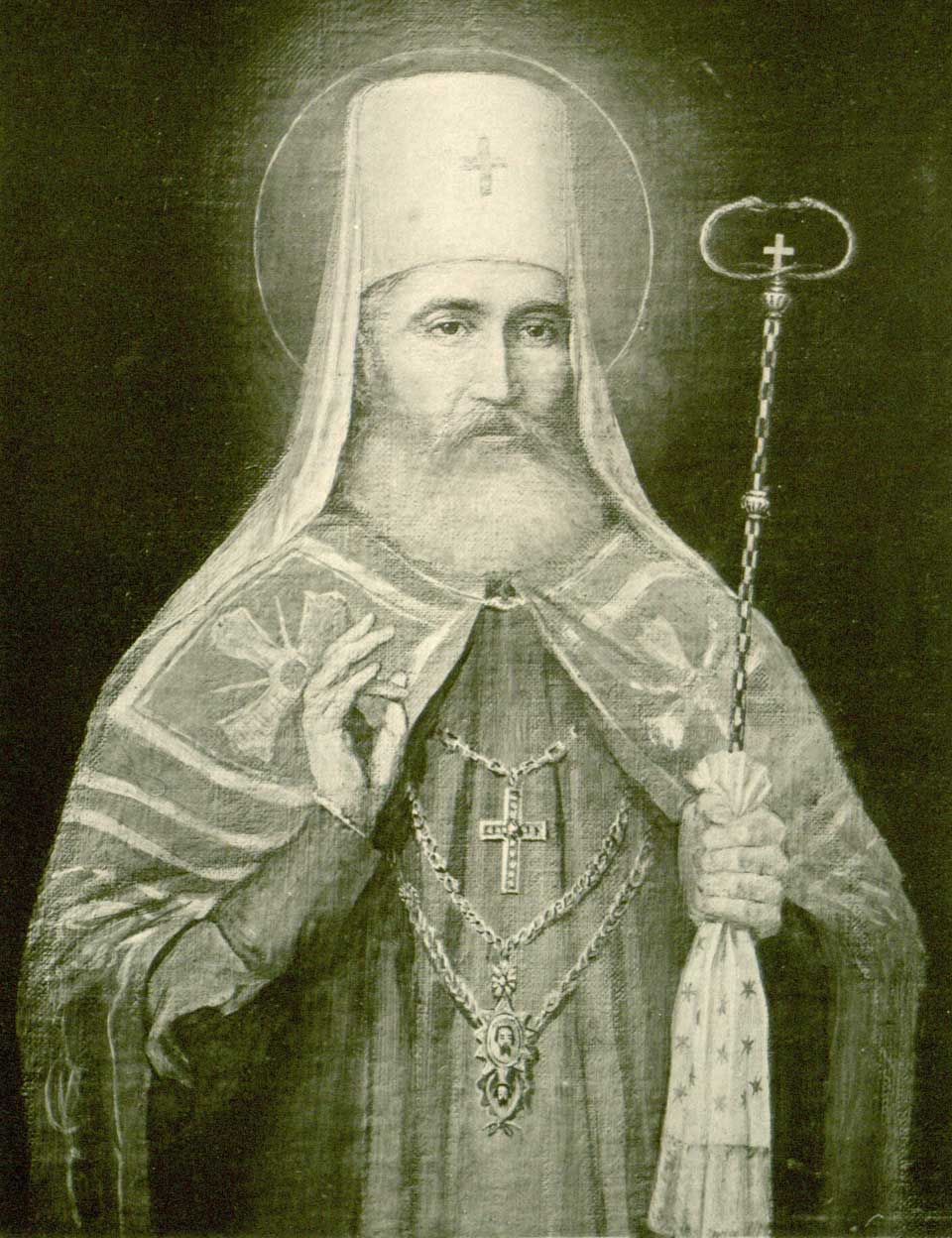
Petar I Petrović-Njegoš, sanctified as Saint Peter of Cetinje

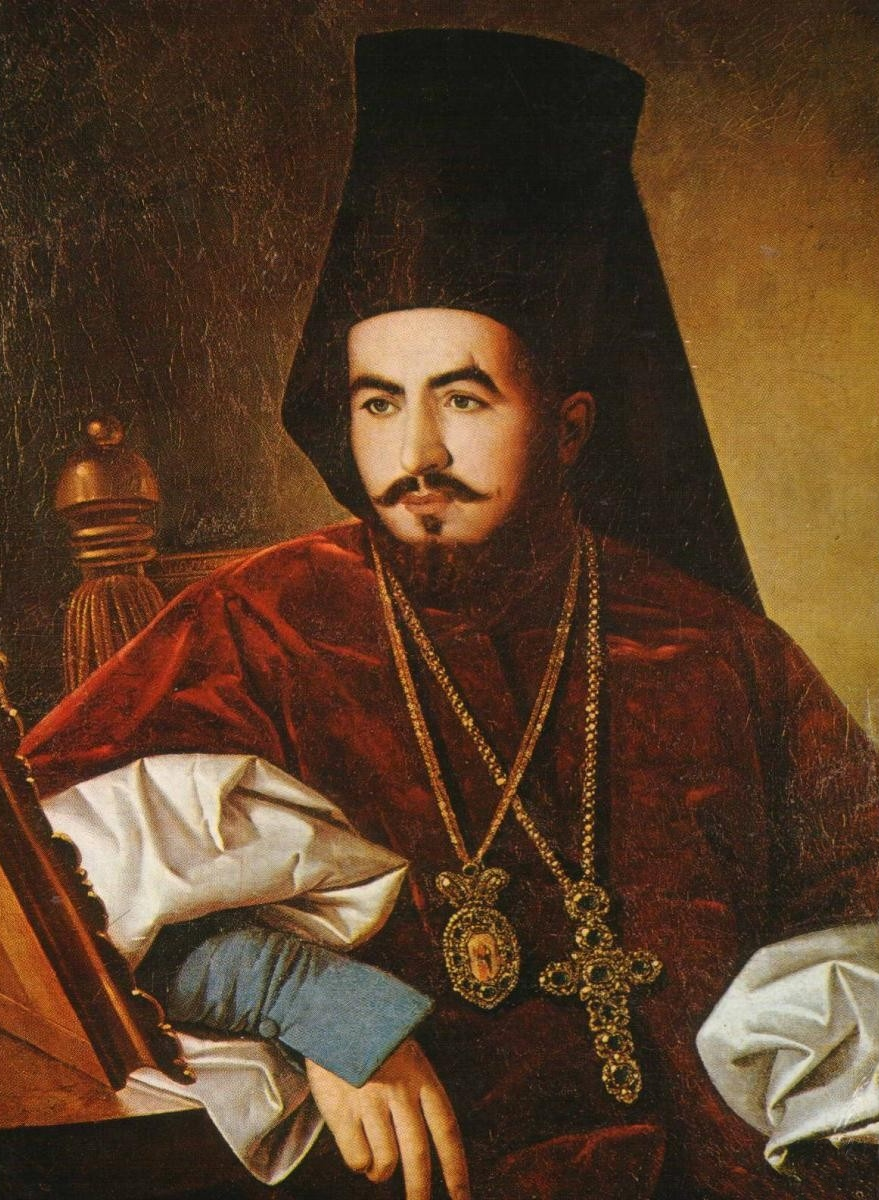
Petar II Petrović-Njegoš

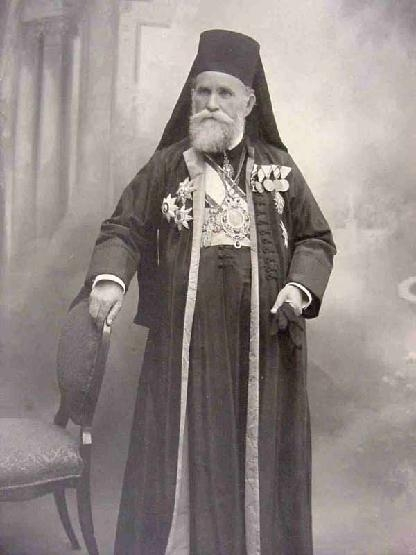
Mitrofan Ban

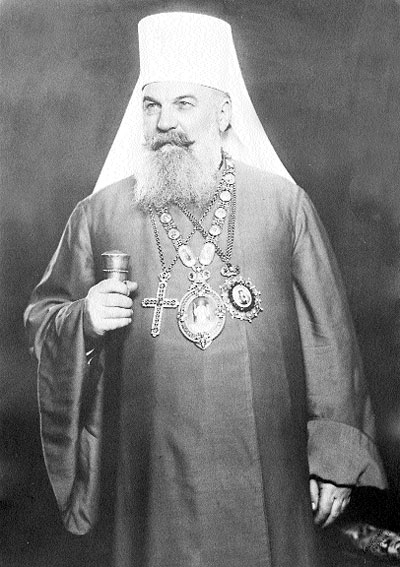
Gavrilo Dožić

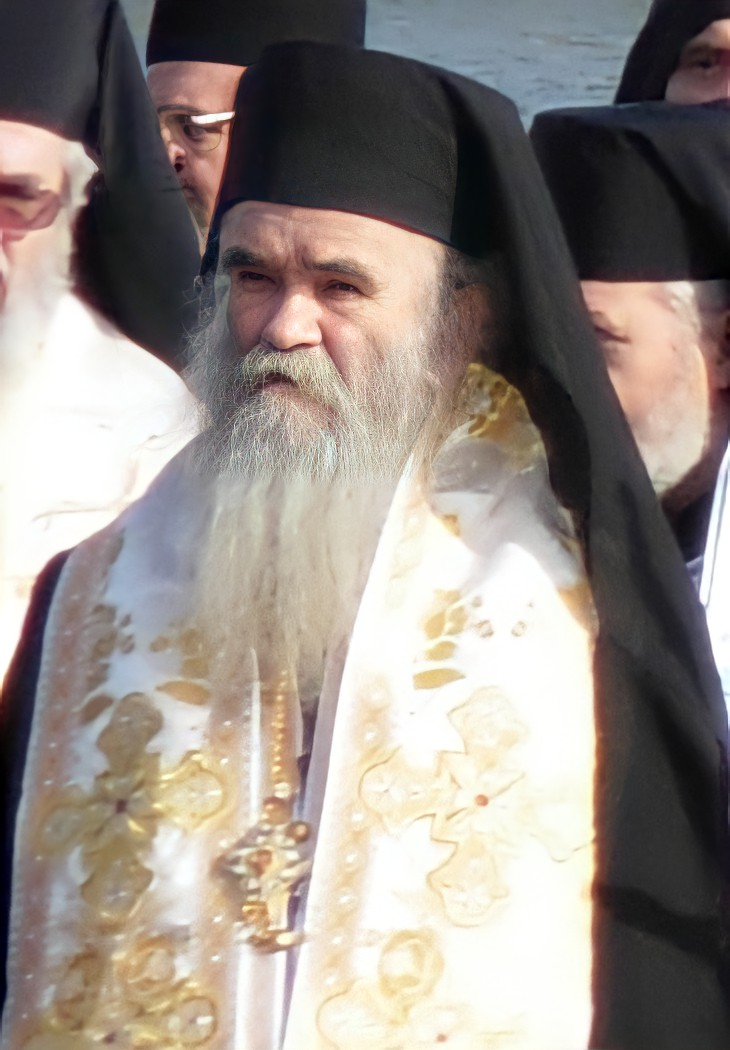
Amfilohije Radović

=== Bishops of Zeta ===
- Ilarion I (1220–1242)
- German I (1242–1250)
- Neofit (1250–1270)
- Jevstatije (1270–1279)
- Jovan (1279–1286)
- German II (1286–1292)
- Mihailo I (1293–1305)
- Andrija (1305–1319)
- Mihailo II (1319)

=== Metropolitans of Zeta ===
- David I (1391–1396)
- Arsenije I (1396–1417)
- David II (1417–1435)
- Jeftimije (1434–1446)
- Teodosije (1446–1453)
- Josif (1453)
- Visarion I (1482–1485)

=== Metropolitans of Cetinje ===
- Pahomije I (1491–1493)
- Vavila (1493–1495)
- Roman (1496)
- German III (1496–1520)
- Pavle (1520–1530)
- Vasilije I (1530–1532)
- Romil I (1532–1540)
- Nikodim (1540)
- Ruvim I (1540–1550)
- Makarije (1550–1558)
- Dionisije (1558)
- Romil II (1558–1561)
- Ruvim II (1551–1569)
- Pahomije II (1569–1579)
- Gerasim (1575–1582)
- Venjamin (1582–1591)
- Stefan (1591–1593)
- Rufim Njeguš (1593–1636)
- Mardarije Kornečanin (1637–1659)
- Rufim Boljević (1673–1685)
- Vasilije II (1685)
- Visarion II (1685–1692)
- Sava Očinić (1694–1697)

=== Metropolitans of Montenegro ===
- Danilo Petrović-Njegoš (1697–1735)
- Sava Petrović (1735–1781)
- Vasilije Petrović (1750–1766)
- Arsenije Plamenac (1781–1784)
- Petar I Petrović-Njegoš (1784–1830)
- Petar II Petrović-Njegoš (1830–1851)
- Danilo II Petrović-Njegoš (1851–1852)

=== Metropolitans of Montenegro and Brda ===
- Nikanor Ivanović (1858–1860)
- Ilarion Roganović (1860–1882)
- Visarion Ljubiša (1882–1884)
- Mitrofan Ban (1884–1920)

=== Metropolitans of Montenegro and the Littoral ===
- Gavrilo Dožić (1920–1938)
- Joanikije Lipovac (1938–1945)
- Vladimir Rajić (administrator) (1946–1947)
- Arsenije Bradvarević (1947–1961)
- Danilo Dajković (1961–1990)
- Amfilohije Radović (1990–2020)
- Joanikije Mićović (2020–present)

== Notable monasteries ==
- Cetinje
- Ostrog
- Morača
- Reževići
- Savina
- Stanjevići
- Beška
- Dajbabe
- Podlastva
- Podmaine
- Praskvica
- Donji Brčeli
- Kom
- Vranjina
- Moračnik
- Orahovo

== Gallery ==
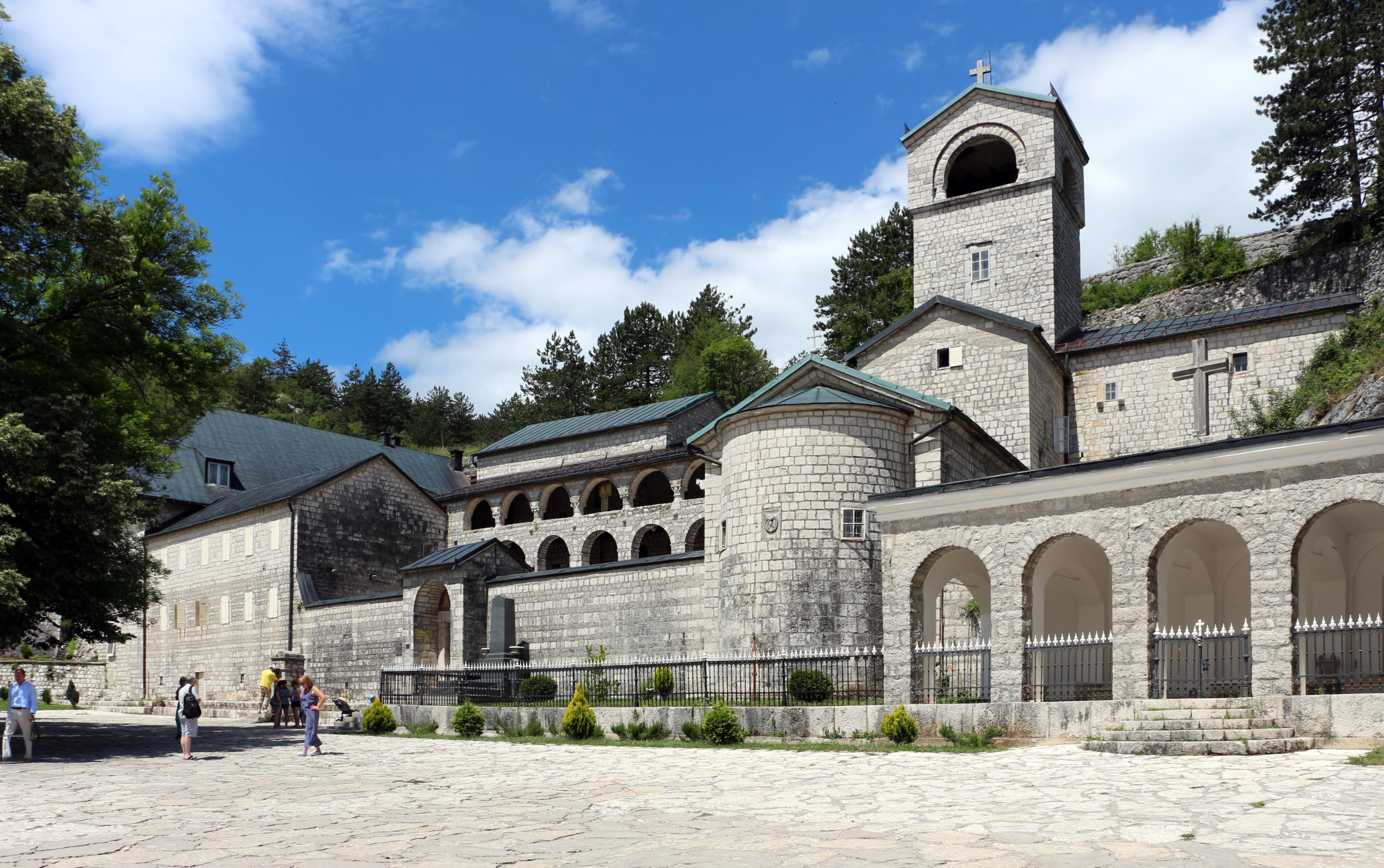
Cetinje Monastery (Cetinje)

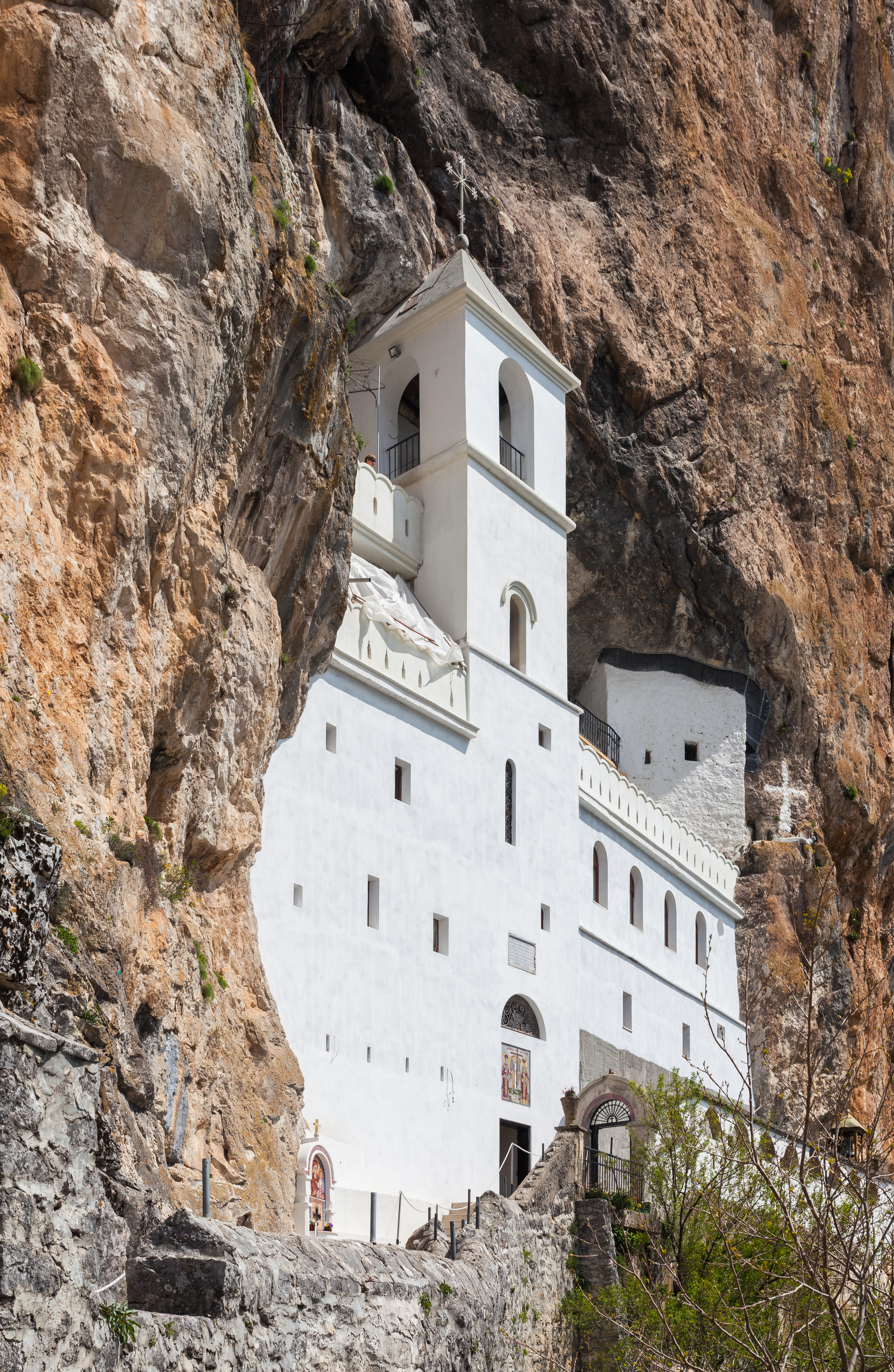
Ostrog Monastery
(near Nikšić)

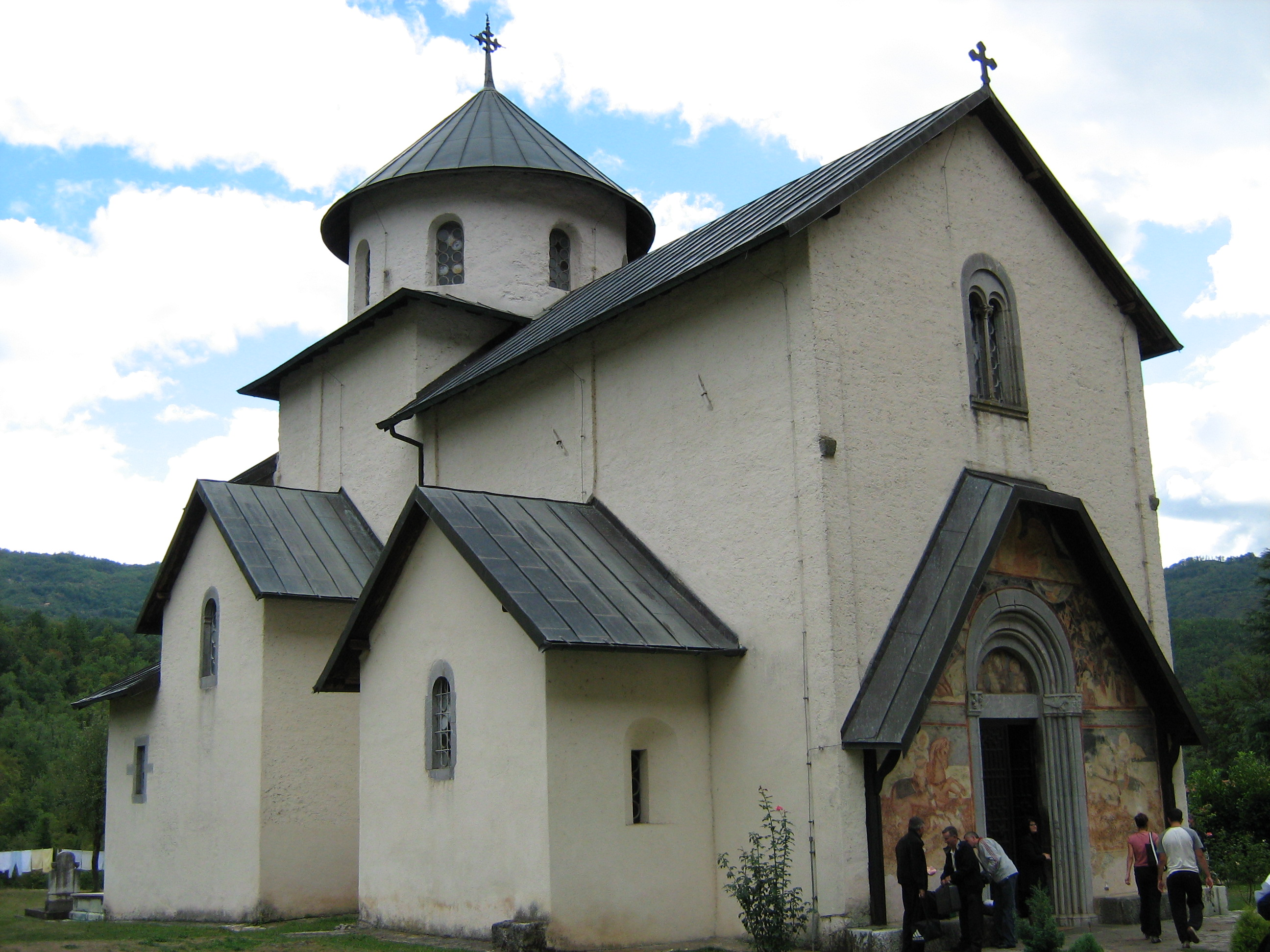
Morača Monastery
(near Kolašin)

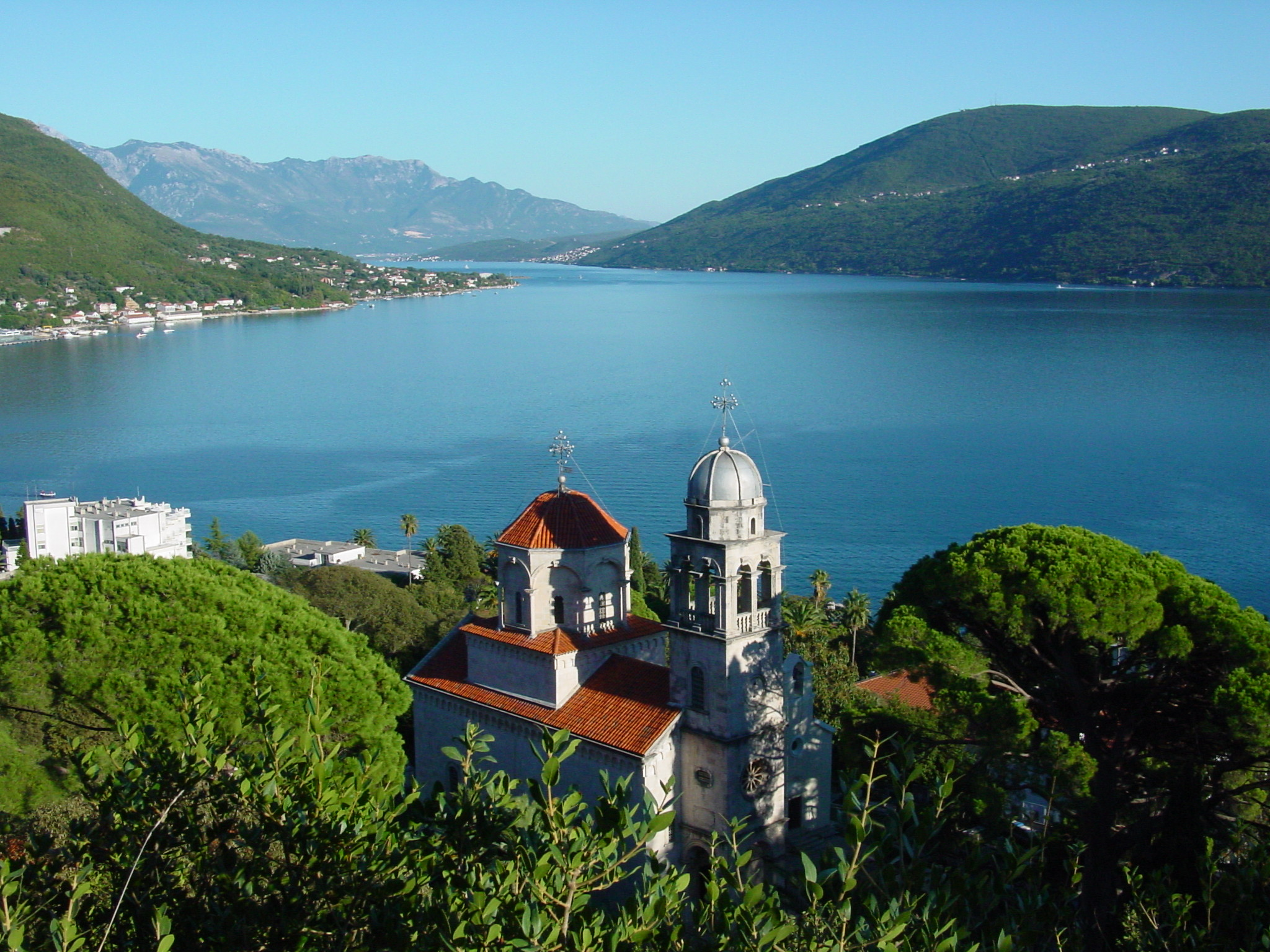
Savina Monastery (Herceg Novi)

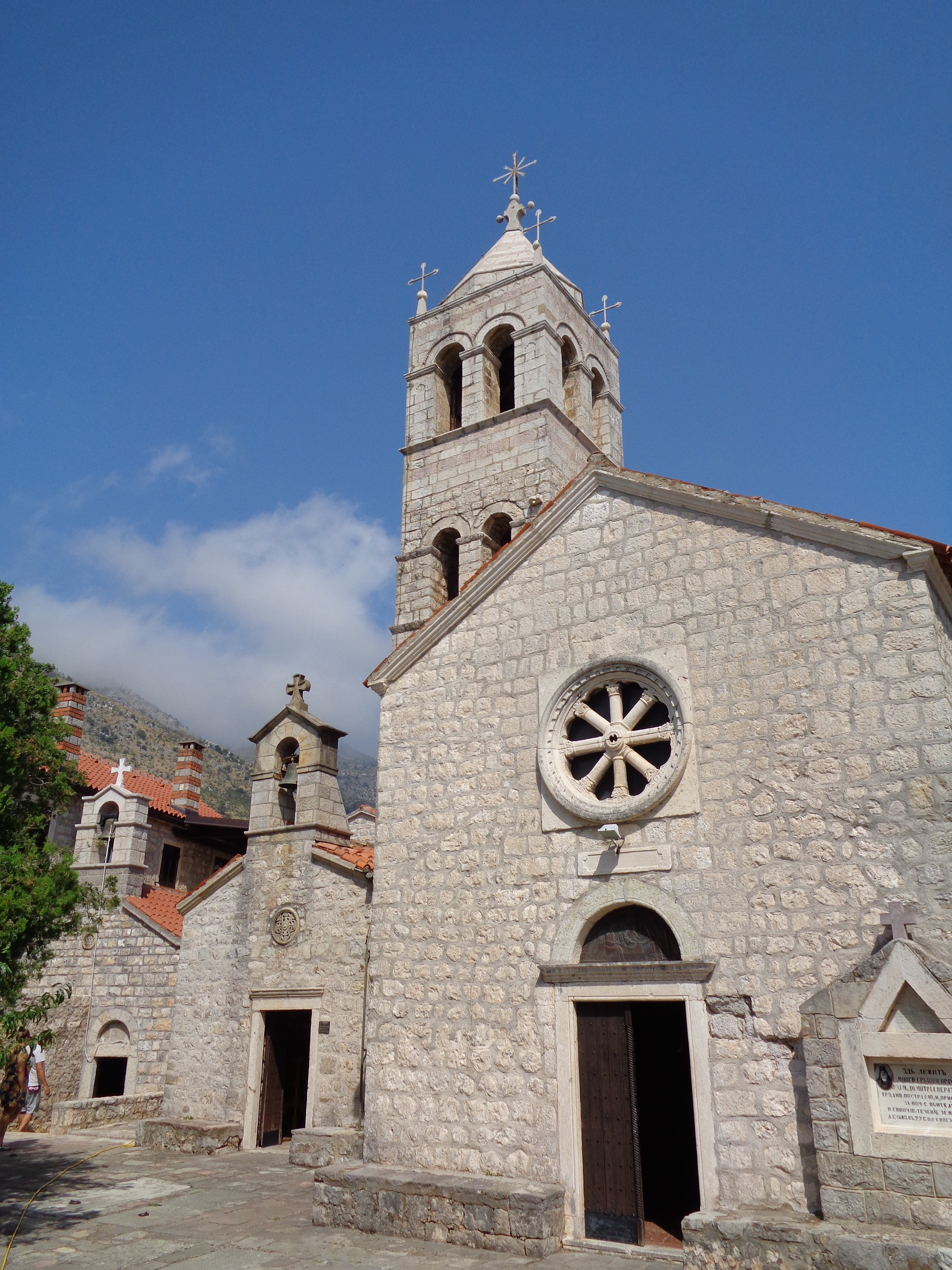
Reževići Monastery (near Budva)

== See also ==
- Eastern Orthodoxy in Montenegro
- Eparchies and metropolitanates of the Serbian Orthodox Church
- Saint Peter of Cetinje Serbian Orthodox Seminary

== Sources ==
- Aleksov, Bojan (2014). "The Serbian Orthodox Church". Orthodox Christianity and Nationalism in Nineteenth-Century Southeastern Europe. Oxford: Oxford University Press. pp. 65–100. ISBN 9780823256068.
- Bataković, Dušan T., ed. (2005). Histoire du peuple serbe [History of the Serbian People] (in French). Lausanne: L’Age d’Homme. ISBN 9782825119587.
- Buchenau, Klaus (2014). "The Serbian Orthodox Church". Eastern Christianity and Politics in the Twenty-First Century. London-New York: Routledge. pp. 67–93. ISBN 9781317818663.
- Cattaruzza, Amaël; Michels, Patrick (2005). "Dualité orthodoxe au Monténégro". Balkanologie: Revue d'études pluridisciplinaires. 9 (1–2): 235–253.
- Ćirković, Sima (2004). The Serbs. Malden: Blackwell Publishing. ISBN 9781405142915.
- Curta, Florin (2006). Southeastern Europe in the Middle Ages, 500–1250. Cambridge: Cambridge University Press. ISBN 9780521815390.
- Дурковић-Јакшић, Љубомир (1991). Митрополија црногорска никада није била аутокефална. Београд-Цетиње: Свети архијерејски синод Српске православне цркве, Митрополија црногорско-приморска.
- Džankić, Jelena (2016). "Religion and Identity in Montenegro". Monasticism in Eastern Europe and the Former Soviet Republics. London-New York: Routledge. pp. 110–129. ISBN 9781317391050.
- Fine, John Van Antwerp Jr. (1994) [1987]. The Late Medieval Balkans: A Critical Survey from the Late Twelfth Century to the Ottoman Conquest. Ann Arbor, Michigan: University of Michigan Press. ISBN 0472082604.
- Fotić, Aleksandar (2008). "Serbian Orthodox Church". Encyclopedia of the Ottoman Empire. New York: Infobase Publishing. pp. 519–520. ISBN 9781438110257.
- Ивановић, Филип (2006). Проблематика аутокефалије Митрополије црногорско-приморске. Подгорица-Цетиње: Унирекс, Светигора. ISBN 9788676600335.
- Ivić, Pavle, ed. (1995). The History of Serbian Culture. Edgware: Porthill Publishers. ISBN 9781870732314.
- Јанковић, Марија (1984). "Саборне цркве Зетске епископије и митрополије у средњем веку (Cathedral Churches of the Bishopric and Metropolitanate of Zeta in Middle Ages)". Историјски часопис. 31: 199–204.
- Јанковић, Марија (1985). Епископије и митрополије Српске цркве у средњем веку (Bishoprics and Metropolitanates of Serbian Church in Middle Ages). Београд: Историјски институт САНУ.
- Jelavich, Barbara (1983a). History of the Balkans: Eighteenth and Nineteenth Centuries. Vol. 1. Cambridge University Press. ISBN 9780521274586.
- Jelavich, Barbara (1983b). History of the Balkans: Twentieth Century. Vol. 2. Cambridge University Press. ISBN 9780521274593.
- Mileusnić, Slobodan, ed. (1989). Serbian Orthodox Church: Its past and present. Vol. 7. Belgrade: Serbian Orthodox Church.
- Morrison, Kenneth (2009). Montenegro: A Modern History. London-New York: I.B.Tauris.
- Morrison, Kenneth; Čagorović, Nebojša (2014). "The Political Dynamics of Intra-Orthodox Conflict in Montenegro". Politicization of Religion, the Power of State, Nation, and Faith: The Case of Former Yugoslavia and its Successor States. New York: Palgrave Macmillan. pp. 151–170. doi:10.1057/9781137477866_7. ISBN 978-1-349-50339-1.
- Pavlovich, Paul (1989). The History of the Serbian Orthodox Church. Serbian Heritage Books. ISBN 9780969133124.
- Popović, Svetlana (2002). "The Serbian Episcopal sees in the thirteenth century". Старинар (51: 2001): 171–184.
- Пузовић, Предраг (2015). "Страдање свештеника током Првог светског рата на подручију Цетињске, Пећске и Никшићке епархије" (PDF). Богословље: Часопис Православног богословског факултета у Београду. 74 (2): 211–220.
- Radić, Radmila (2007). "Serbian Christianity". The Blackwell Companion to Eastern Christianity. Malden: Blackwell Publishing. pp. 231–248. ISBN 9780470766392.
- Samardžić, Radovan; Duškov, Milan, eds. (1993). Serbs in European Civilization. Belgrade: Nova, Serbian Academy of Sciences and Arts, Institute for Balkan Studies. ISBN 9788675830153.
- Слијепчевић, Ђоко М. (1962). Историја Српске православне цркве. Vol. 1. Минхен: Искра.
- Слијепчевић, Ђоко М. (1966). Историја Српске православне цркве. Vol. 2. Минхен: Искра.
- Слијепчевић, Ђоко М. (1986). Историја Српске православне цркве. Vol. 3. Келн: Искра.
- Sotirović, Vladislav B. (2011). "The Serbian Patriarchate of Peć in the Ottoman Empire: The First Phase (1557–94)". Serbian Studies Journal of the North American Society for Serbian Studies. 25 (2): 143–169.
- Станојевић, Глигор (1975a). "Црна Гора у XVI вијеку". Историја Црне Горе. Vol. 3. Титоград: Редакција за историју Црне Горе. pp. 1–88.
- Станојевић, Глигор (1975b). "Црна Гора у XVII вијеку". Историја Црне Горе. Vol. 3. Титоград: Редакција за историју Црне Горе. pp. 89–227.
- Станојевић, Глигор (1975c). "Црна Гора у XVIII вијеку". Историја Црне Горе. Vol. 3. Титоград: Редакција за историју Црне Горе. pp. 229–499.
- Вуковић, Сава (1996). Српски јерарси од деветог до двадесетог века (Serbian Hierarchs from the 9th to the 20th Century). Евро, Унирекс, Каленић.
- Wachtel, Andrew B. (2004). "How to Use a Classic: Petar Petrović-Njegoš in the Twentieth Century". Ideologies and National Identities: The Case of Twentieth-Century Southeastern Europe. Budapest: Central European University Press. pp. 131–153. ISBN 9789639241824.
