= Pavle, Metropolitan of Cetinje =

Serbian Orthodox bishop

Pavle, Metropolitan of Cetinje (Serbian Cyrillic: Павле) was a Serbian Orthodox hierarch of the Metropolitanate of Montenegro and the Littoral, a diocese of the Serbian Orthodox Church, who held that post from 1520 to 1530. Metropolitan Pavle is mentioned by Saint Peter of Cetinje in his "Short History of Montenegro" as the successor of Metropolitan German III on the Cetinje see.

Archimandrite Nićifor Dučić states that Metropolitan Pavle's tenure was 1530. Archimandrite Ilarion Ruvarac also agreed with this, who published the contribution "Bishops of Zeta and Montenegro" in 1892. It is possible that this was the time until which he ruled, because Metropolitan Romil I is mentioned under that year in one document (Radmila Tričković, "Serbian Church in the Middle of the 16th Century", Belgrade 1992).

== See also ==
- List of metropolitans of Montenegro
