= Andrija, Bishop of Zeta =

Bishop of Zeta

Andrija, Bishop of Zeta (Serbian Cyrillic: Андрија) was the eight bishop of the Serbian Orthodox Church's Eparchy of Zeta, now the Metropolitanate of Montenegro and the Littoral from 1305 to 1319 during the height of Stefan Uroš II Milutin's reign. Bishop Andrija was succeeded by Mihailo II, Bishop of Zeta.

== Literature ==
- Sava Vuković: Srpski jerarsi od devetog do dvadesetog veka (Serbian Hierarchs from the ninth to the twentieth century), 1996
