= Vlach Church =

15th-century church in Montenegro

Coordinates: 42.3909°N 18.9244°E

- Влашка Црква
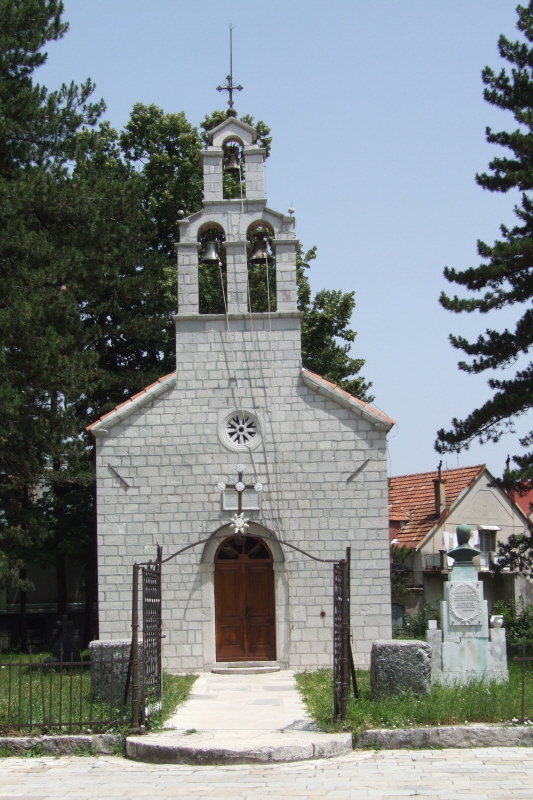

Religion
- Affiliation: Serbian Orthodox Church
- Ecclesiastical or organisational status: Metropolitanate of Montenegro and the Littoral

Location
- Municipality: Cetinje
- State: Montenegro
- Interactive map of Vlach Church

Architecture
- Founder: Vlachs who guarded the cattle of Ivan Crnojević
- Completed: c. 1450

Specifications
- Direction of façade: West
- Materials: "plot"; "suvomeđa"; "klačena"; stone

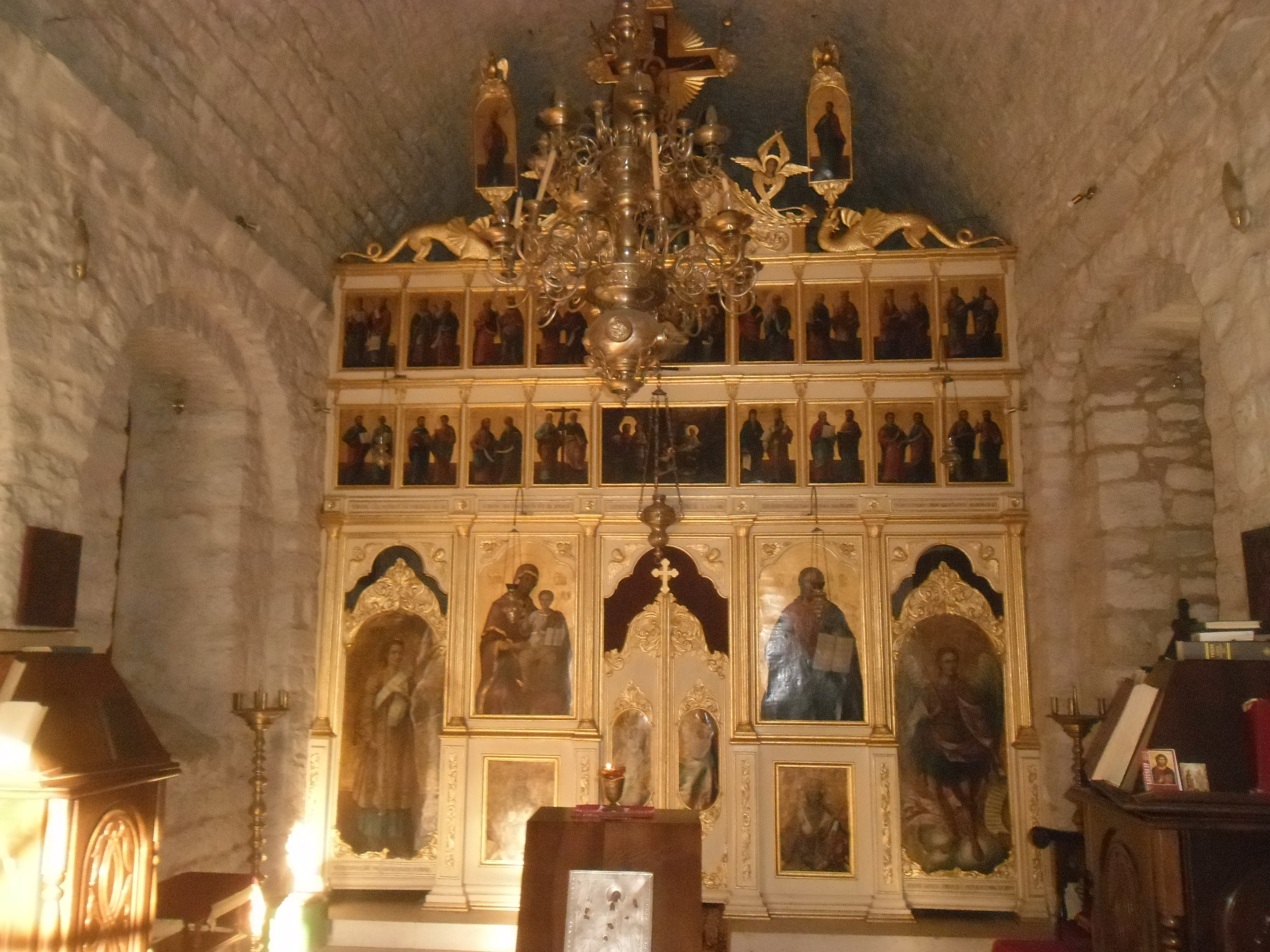
Interior

The Vlach Church (Serbian: Влашка црква, romanized: Vlaška crkva) is a Serbian Orthodox church built in 1450 in the village of Donji Kraj, on the Cetinje field, at that time part of Zeta (present-day Montenegro).

== Stećci ==
The church was built around 1450 on the site of a Bogomil necropolis that included around 150 stećci (monumental, ornate tombstones). Only two of these have been preserved to this day. Originally facing each other, they were recently reoriented to be side by side. According to some legends, recorded for the first time by Ljubomir Nenadović, the 17th-century military commander Bajo Pivljanin and his wife are buried beneath them. According to another legend and documentary evidence, the stećci mark the graves of the founders of the church — Ivan Borojević, born in Stari Vlah, and his wife Jelica.

== Origin of the name ==
One theory states that the church received its name from the Vlachs who guarded the cattle of Ivan Crnojević and built the church around 1450.

There are several additional theories about the origin of the term Vlach in the name of the church. Some authors believe that the term in the name of this church is used as an exonym. Other theories connect the name of the church to the fact that the terms such as "Vlach's church" or "Vlach's rituals" were indicators of membership in the Eastern Orthodox Church and Orthodoxy or to demonym Vlach (according to them this church was allegedly built by settlers from Stari Vlah in modern Serbia).

== Building materials ==
The church was initially made of sticks (Serbian: плот, romanized: plot), switches and mud and was rebuilt three times. At first, it was redone in stones without mortar (Serbian: сувомеђа, romanized: suvomeđa), then in stones with lime mortar (Serbian: клачена, romanized: klačena) and finally, in 1864, the church received its current form. A guard rail around the church was built in 1897 using barrels of Ottoman rifles captured in 1858 during the Battle of Grahovac.
