= Jovan, Bishop of Zeta =

Jovan Јован
- Bishop of Zeta
- Church: Serbian Orthodox Church
- Diocese: Eparchy of Zeta (1219–1346)
- See: Monastery of Holy Archangel Michael, Prevlaka, Montenegro
- Appointed: after 1279
- Installed: after 1279
- Term ended: 1286
- Predecessor: Jevstatije I
- Successor: German II

Personal details
- Born: Unknown
- Died: Unknown
- Denomination: Serbian Orthodox

Jovan (Anglicized: John; Serbian Cyrillic: Јован; r. 1279–1286) was likely the fifth bishop of Zeta. He succeeded Jevstatije I, the fourth bishop of the Eparchy of Zeta and an archbishop of Serbia, and preceded German II, the sixth bishop of the Eparchy of Zeta.

== Biography ==
It's not known who succeeded Jevstatije I, a bishop of the Eparchy of Zeta and a future archbishop of Serbia. However, it's assumed that Jovan was the person who succeeded him. He was mentioned in the forgeries for the Christian pyrgos. Although it's not known when Jovan became a bishop, it's assumed that he became one after the years 1279 to 1304.
