= Praskvica Monastery =

Serbian Orthodox monastery near Budva, Montenegro

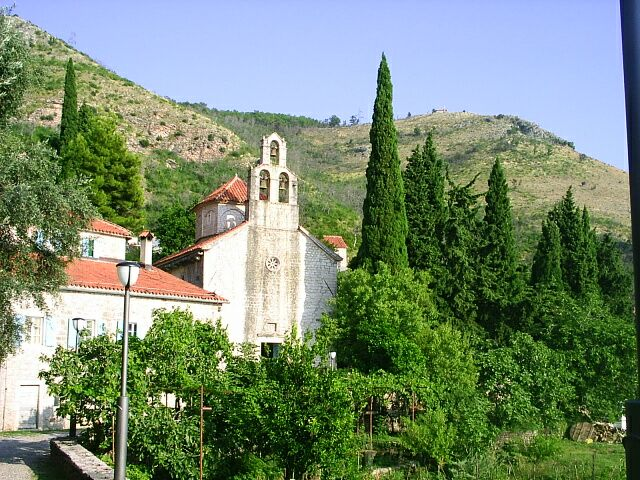

- Location within Montenegro

Religion
- Affiliation: Serbian Orthodox Church
- Ecclesiastical or organizational status: Metropolitanate of Montenegro and the Littoral

Location
- Location: Čelobrdo near Budva
- State: Montenegro
- Interactive map of Praskvica Monastery
- Coordinates: 42°16′08″N 18°54′37″E

Architecture
- Completed: 1050 (according to the legend)

The Praskvica Monastery (Serbian: Манастир Прасквица, romanized: Manastir Praskvica) is a Serbian Orthodox monastery in Čelobrdo, a village in the Budva municipality in modern-day Montenegro. It was a spiritual and political center of the Paštrovići clan. The name of the monastery is taken from the peach-scented water of the nearby spring (praskva, diminutive praskvica, meaning a "peach").

== Establishment ==
According to the legend, the monastery was founded in 1050, but the first document that mentions it was composed in 1307. The document is a charter that Stephen Uroš II Milutin of Serbia issued during his visit to Kotor, in which he confirmed to the Church of the Holy Trinity the ownership over villages granted to the church by his mother, Saint Helen of Serbia.

== Architecture ==
Six churches belong to Praskvica Monastery.

Two churches are within the complex of the monastery. The older church is dedicated to the Holy Trinity while the other, built by Balša III and his mother Jelena in 1413, is dedicated to Saint Nicholas. The church was built in the Raška architectural school style. In the same year, a small house was built near the church. After the church was reconstructed in 1847, only a part of one wall of the original church building remained.

There are four churches on the Sveti Stefan island that also belong to Praskvica Monastery. One of them was destroyed by the communists during World War II, and was later turned into a casino. The Church of Saint Stephen (Serbian: Црква Светог Архиђакона Стефана) is one of the remaining churches on Sveti Stefan that belongs to Praskvica Monastery. Serbian tennis star Novak Djokovic married Jelena Ristić on 12 July 2014 in this church.

Some of the monastery icons were painted in 1681 by a painter named Radul. According to some stories, the cross of Emperor Dušan is kept in this monastery. In 1813, when Montenegrin Littoral became part of the Illyrian Provinces, the monastery was plundered by Napoleonic forces.

== Jegor Stroganov ==
There is a popular story about Jegor Stroganov, a one-armed Russian military officer who lived in the monastery as a monk from the late 18th century to the early 19th century. According to this story he came to Budva at the end of the 18th century and became a monk in Praskvica and pledged for silence. At the beginning of the 19th century, he took ten years to build a 3-kilometer stone road from Sveti Stefan to the monastery. This road is eponymously called "Jegor's Road" after him. A drama by the same name, written by Serbian playwright Vida Ognjenović, was inspired by the story about Stroganov.

== See also ==
- List of Serbian Orthodox monasteries
