= Cetinje Monastery =

Serbian Orthodox monastery in Cetinje, Montenegro

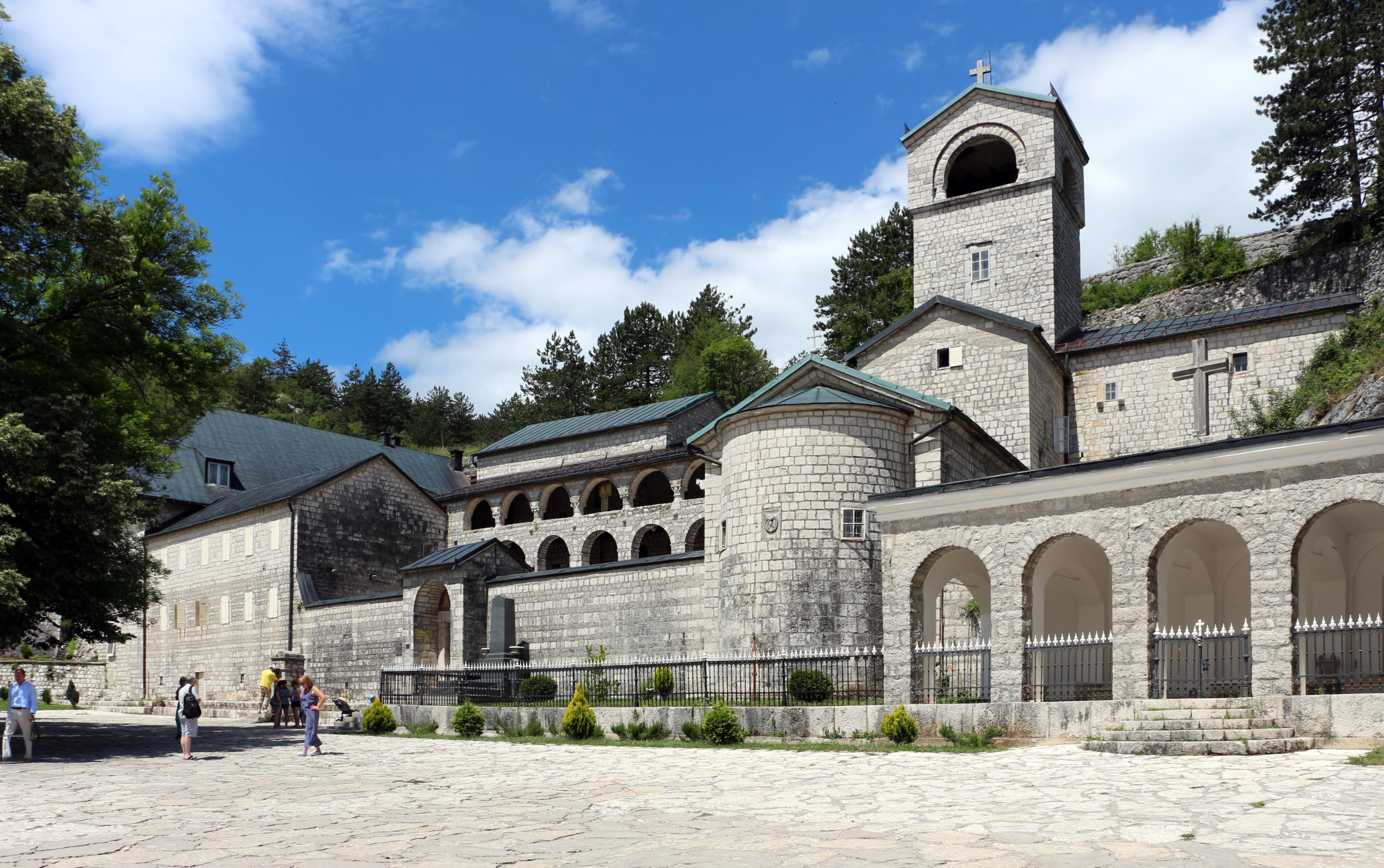

Religion
- Affiliation: Serbian Orthodox Church
- Province: Metropolitanate of Montenegro and the Littoral

Location
- Location: Cetinje, Montenegro
- Interactive map of Cetinje Monastery
- Coordinates: 42.3876740°N 18.9214195°E

Architecture
- Completed: 1484, rebuilt between 1701–1704

The Cetinje Monastery (Serbian: Цетињски манастир, romanized: Cetinjski manastir) is a Serbian Orthodox monastery in Cetinje, Montenegro. It is the seat of the Metropolitanate of Montenegro and the Littoral. A center of historical and cultural importance, it was founded c. 1484 by Prince Ivan Crnojević of Zeta, and designated as the cathedral monastery of the Eparchy of Zeta. It was devastated in 1692, during the Morean War, and rebuilt between 1701 and 1704 by Metropolitan Danilo Petrović-Njegoš on the site of the former court of Ivan Crnojević.

There are several relics in the monastery: remains of St. Peter of Cetinje, right hand of John the Baptist, particles of the True Cross, bishop's crown of St. Peter of Cetinje, among others.

== History ==
The medieval Cetinje Monastery, also known as the Old Cetinje Monastery, was built by Ivan Crnojević in 1484, and founded on 4 January 1485, at Ćipur, and dedicated to the Nativity of the Theotokos (Hram Roždestva presvete Bogorodice). During his stay in Ancona, Crnojević was inspired by Basilica della Santa Casa in Loreto where he took an oath that he will build a church also dedicated to Mother of God upon his return in Zeta. It became the seat of the newly founded Eparchy of Cetinje, a successor to the Metropolitanate of Zeta. Its episcope was Visarion (fl. 1485). It is believed that the monastery was about twenty metres long and about six metres wide based upon the monastery's original designs by the Venetian engineer, Barbieri. In an etching in the book Oktoih, it seems the medieval Cetinje Monastery was a three-naved basilica, with a cupola on the center nave with elements of renaissance architecture. Around the monastery was a 1,400-square-meter (15,000 sq ft) complex with two smaller churches and an inn.

During the Morean War, monastery was in peril twice. Apparently, during the first plunder of Cetinje, after the Battle of Vrtijeljka, the forces of Süleyman Bushati did not gravely damage the monastery. Their idea was to pacify Montenegrins, and prevent them from aiding Venetian war effort. On the other hand, his army comprised a considerable amount of forcibly mobilised Christians, and he was afraid of mutiny. The popular tale has it that expeditionary force did start to rob the monastery, however, as one of the soldiers was trying to take down a cross from the top of the roof, he was struck by lightning, which was immediately perceived as Gods sign. In 1689, the Venetians were invited to take control of Cetinje. As they arrived, they quickly fortified themselves in the monastery and in the nearby former court of Crnojević. It thus served as a garrison for three years, when Cetinje was attacked again by Suleyman on 25 September 1692. Instead of fighting, Venetians entered negotiations, and reached an agreement to abandon the monastery under honorable terms. However, they mined a monastery with a time bomb, which set of in the evening hours, right after Venetians retreated and as the Ottomans were victoriously entering the monastery, killing many of them in the process. This resulted in seat of Metropolitanate being moved to Dobrska Ćelija monastery for some time. Vladika Danilo reestablished it, in 1701 or 1704, across the site of the first location, atop the remains of the court with stone from the old one, and added a tablet with the coat of arms of the Crnojević family, and a dedication to Ivan Crnojević. Before 1714, it was burnt, and then it was reconstructed yet again around 1743 by Metropolitan Sava Petrović Njegoš. It was the center of spiritual, cultural and political life of the Prince-Bishopric of Montenegro. Its importance is clearly emphasised in Prince-Bishop Vasilije's exaggerated claim, written in his "History of Montenegro", that ... before its destruction, Cetinje Monastery was among the most beautiful monasteries in Europe. The last time monastery was devastated was in 1785, when Mahmud Pasha Bushati sacked Cetinje. It has been built on several times, the current appearance dates to 1927. The original site of the monastery, known as Ćipur (after Greek word Κήπος - Garden) was used in 1886 by Prince Nicholas of Montenegro for his Court church. The position of the newly built church follows the lineup of the original one from inside the monastery complex. Today its ruin along with couple of pillars can be seen.

== Gallery ==
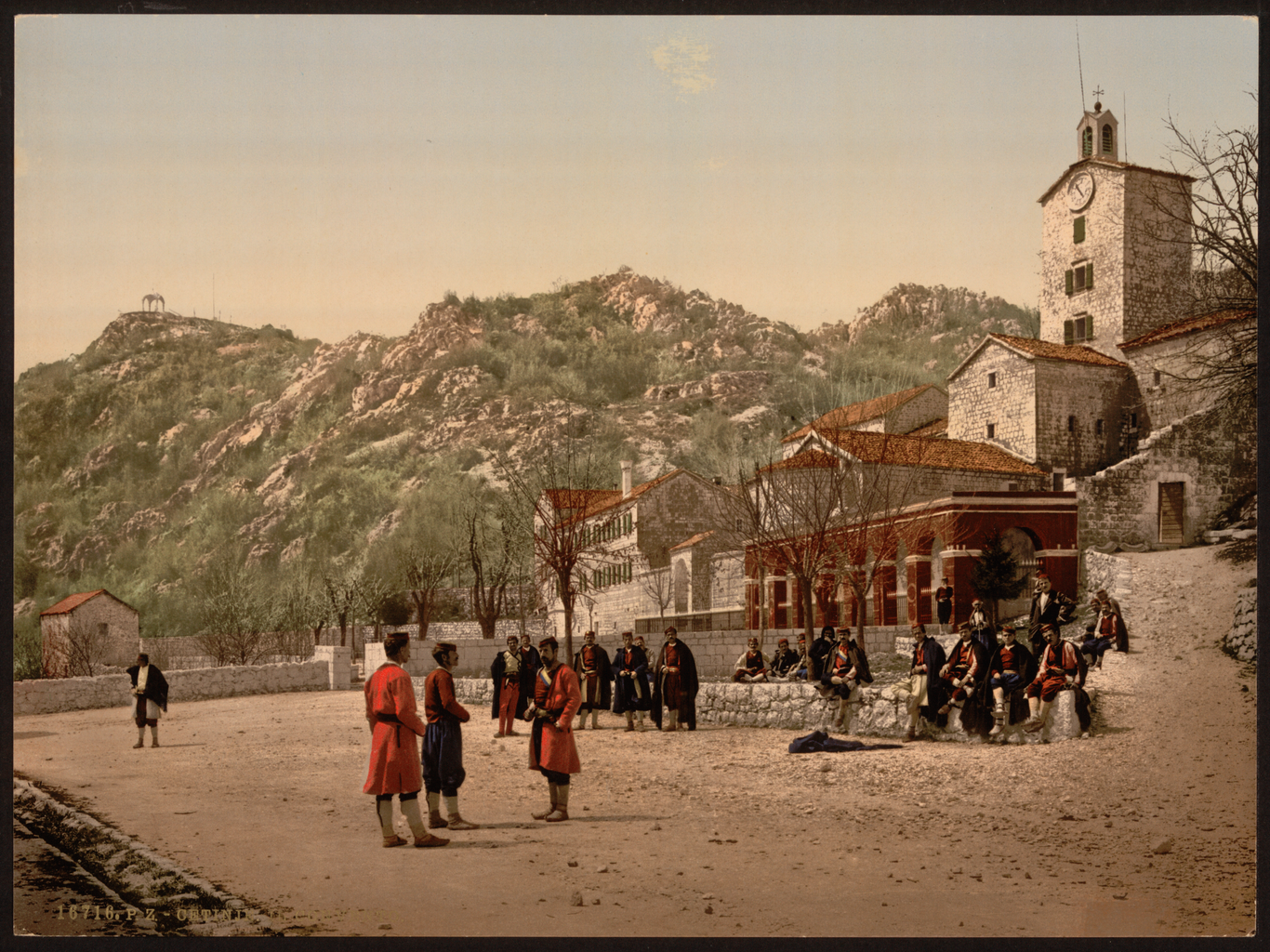
Monastery, 1889

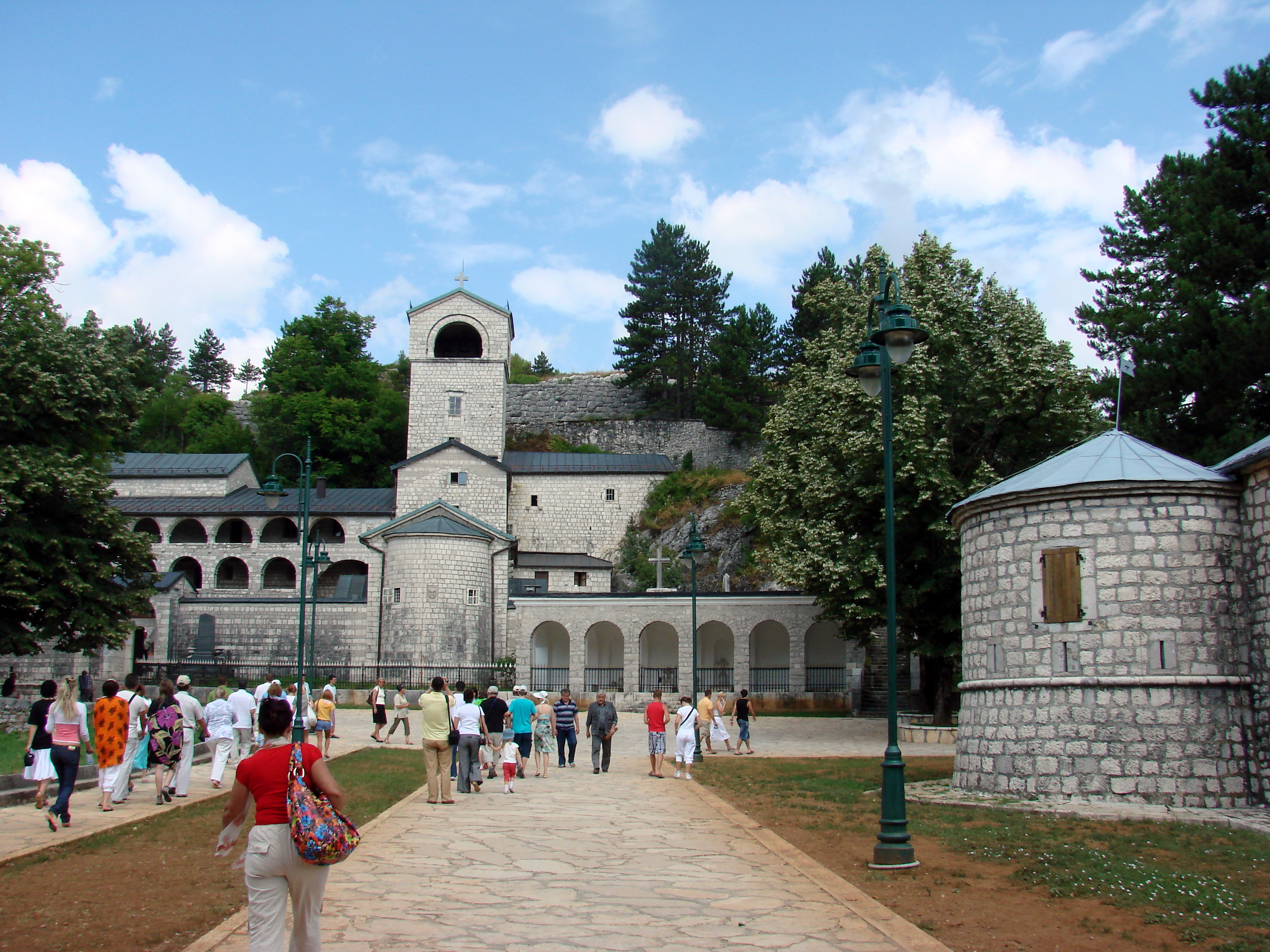
Monastery

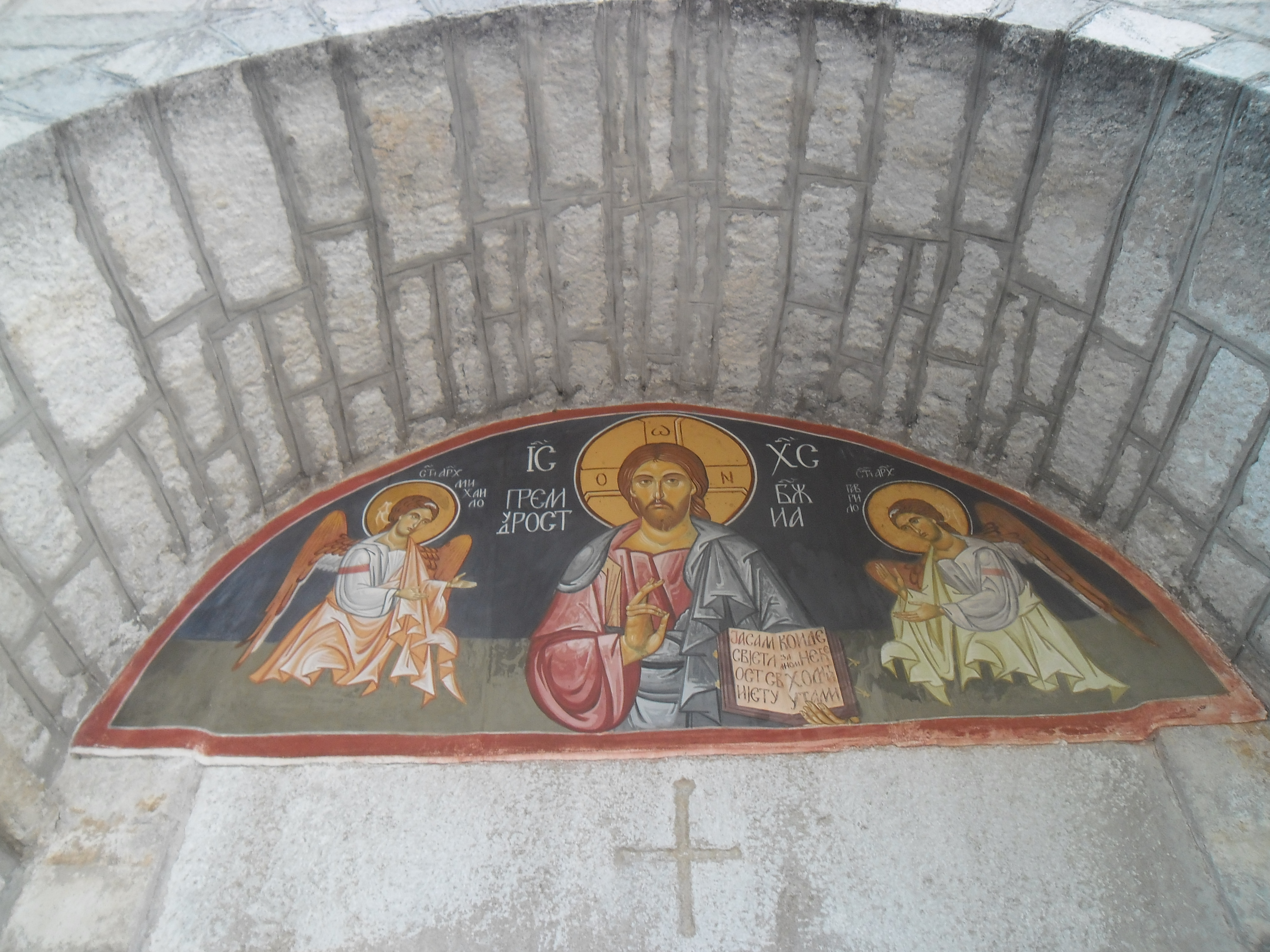
Mosaic details

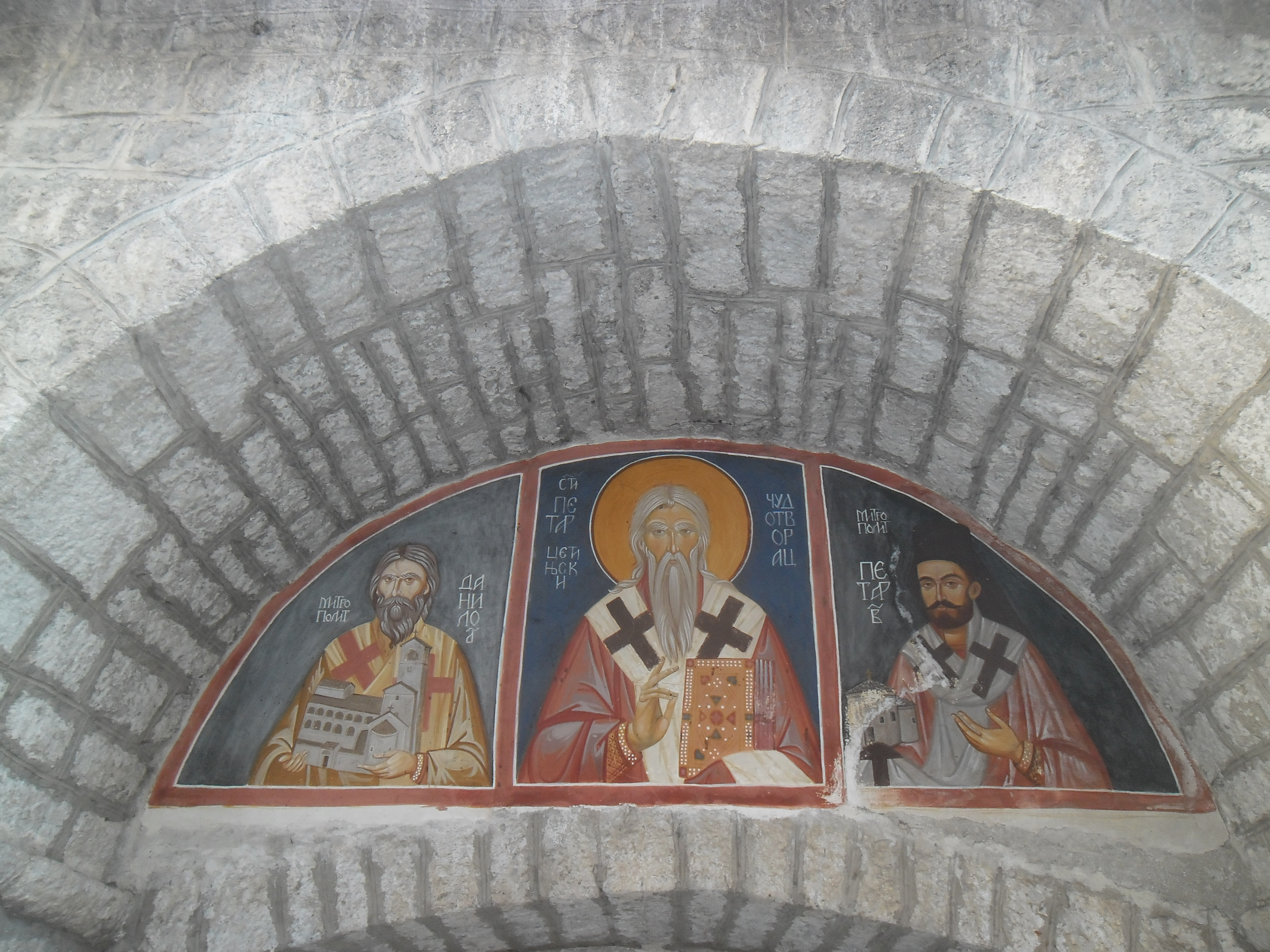
Mosaic details

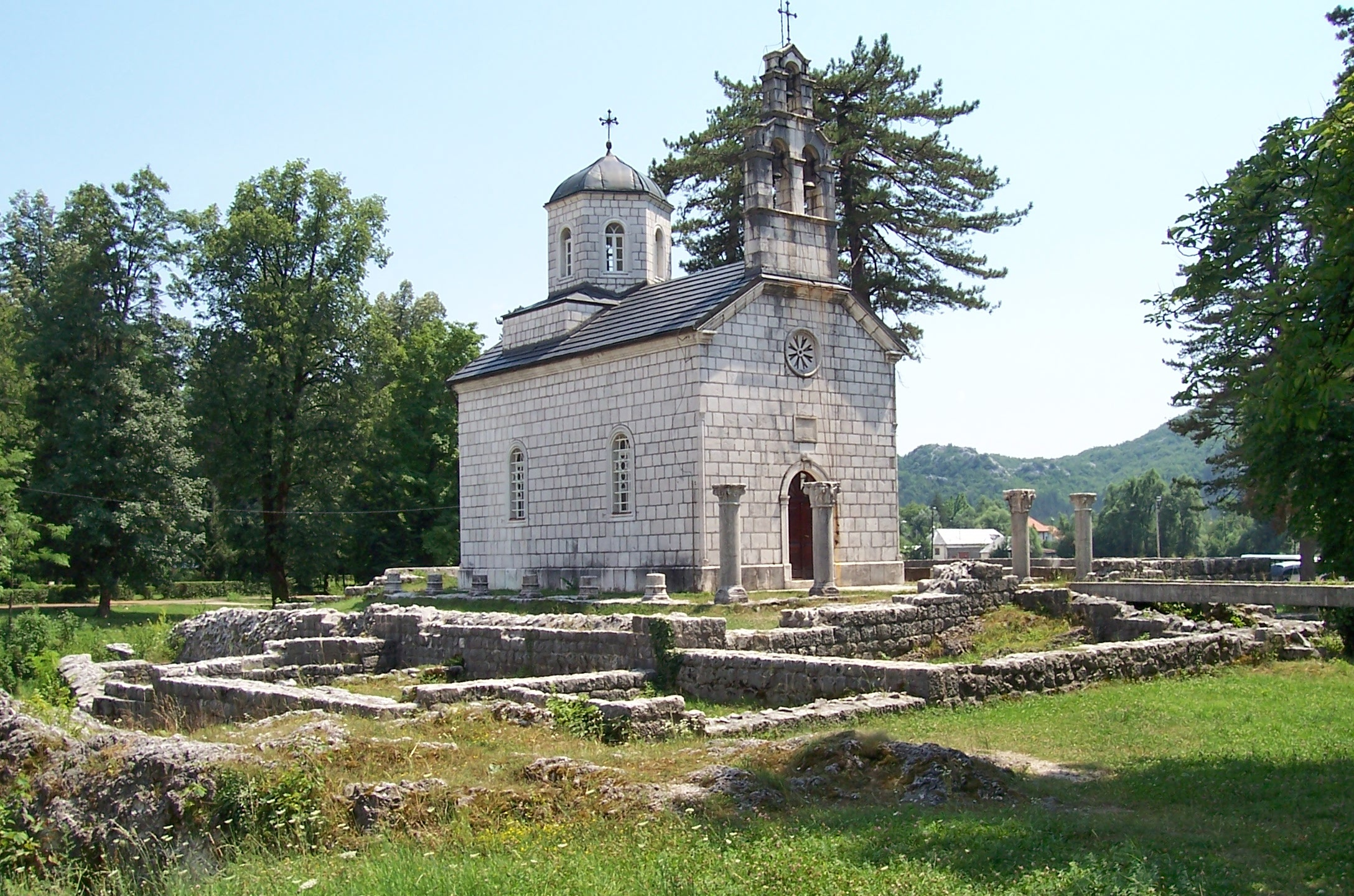
Remains of the original monastery can be seen around the Court Church

== See also ==
- List of Serbian Orthodox monasteries

== Sources ==
- Ćirković, Sima (2004). The Serbs. Malden: Blackwell Publishing. ISBN 9781405142915.
- Fine, John Van Antwerp Jr. (1994) [1987]. The Late Medieval Balkans: A Critical Survey from the Late Twelfth Century to the Ottoman Conquest. Ann Arbor, Michigan. ISBN 0472082604.
- Mileusnić, Slobodan, ed. (1989). Serbian Orthodox Church: Its past and present. Vol. 7. Belgrade: Serbian Orthodox Church.
- Pavlovich, Paul (1989). The History of the Serbian Orthodox Church. Serbian Heritage Books. ISBN 9780969133124.
