= Stevan Todorović =

Serbian painter (1832–1925)

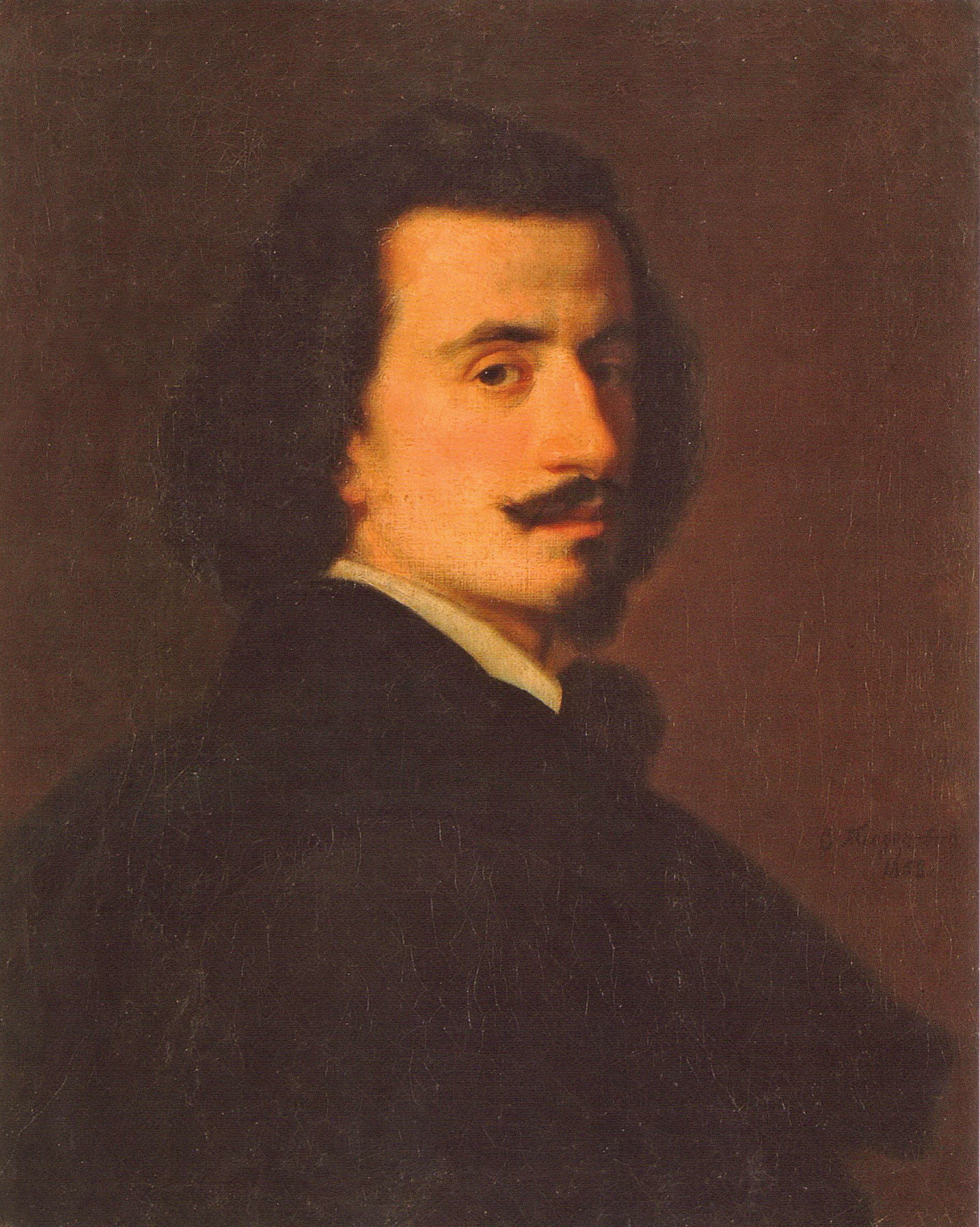
- Born: 1832; Novi Sad, Austrian Empire
- Died: 1925 (aged 92–93); Belgrade, Kingdom of Serbs, Croats, and Slovenes
- Movement: Romanticism, later Academism

Stevan Todorović (Serbian Cyrillic: Стеван Тодоровић; 1832 – 1925) was a Serbian painter and the founder of modern fencing and Sokol movement in Yugoslavia.

== Biography ==
Born in Novi Sad, Todorović moved in 1839 to Szeged, where he completed elementary school and five grades of high school. In 1850 he relocated to Vienna to study art. After several years in Vienna, he settled in Belgrade, where he was engaged with a gymnastic and fencing club, as well as theatre. He also ran a successful drawing school.

In 1864, he married painter Poleksija Todorović (née Ban), who was his wife for over sixty years. They worked together on various projects in churches across Serbia, including iconostases in Church of the Nativity of the Virgin in Bogatić and in the Holy Trinity Church in Negotin.

He was a correspondent and war painter for a number of domestic and foreign newspapers during the Serbian-Turkish Wars (1876–1878), and became known as the founder of war painting in Serbia. From the Balkan Wars, and later World War I, this was no longer an individual occupation but a task subject to state and military regulations.

Todorović was close to the Obrenović royal house. He made portraits of almost all members of the royal family, including Natalie of Serbia; his portrait of her helped in making her the "Serbian Mona Lisa".

He exhibited his artworks as a part of Kingdom of Serbia's pavilion at International Exhibition of Art of 1911.

In the course of his long life, he created art under various visual poetics, chiefly Romanticism to Academicism. His best works were carried out in the Romantic spirit. His extensive artistic legacy consists of portraits, religious and historical paintings, landscapes, and numerous studies and drawings. Much of his artistic activities is related to Serbia and Belgrade in which cultural and social life he actively participated. He opened the first art school in Belgrade where youngsters learned drawing, singing, fencing, and gymnastic exercises. Owing to a long life and extraordinary tenacity and hard work, he managed to create a rich painting opus.

Also, Stevan Todorović's work can be found in the collection of Milan Jovanović Stojimirović who bequeathed a large number of paintings, sketches, and artifacts to the Art Department of the Museum in Smederevo.

== Gallery ==
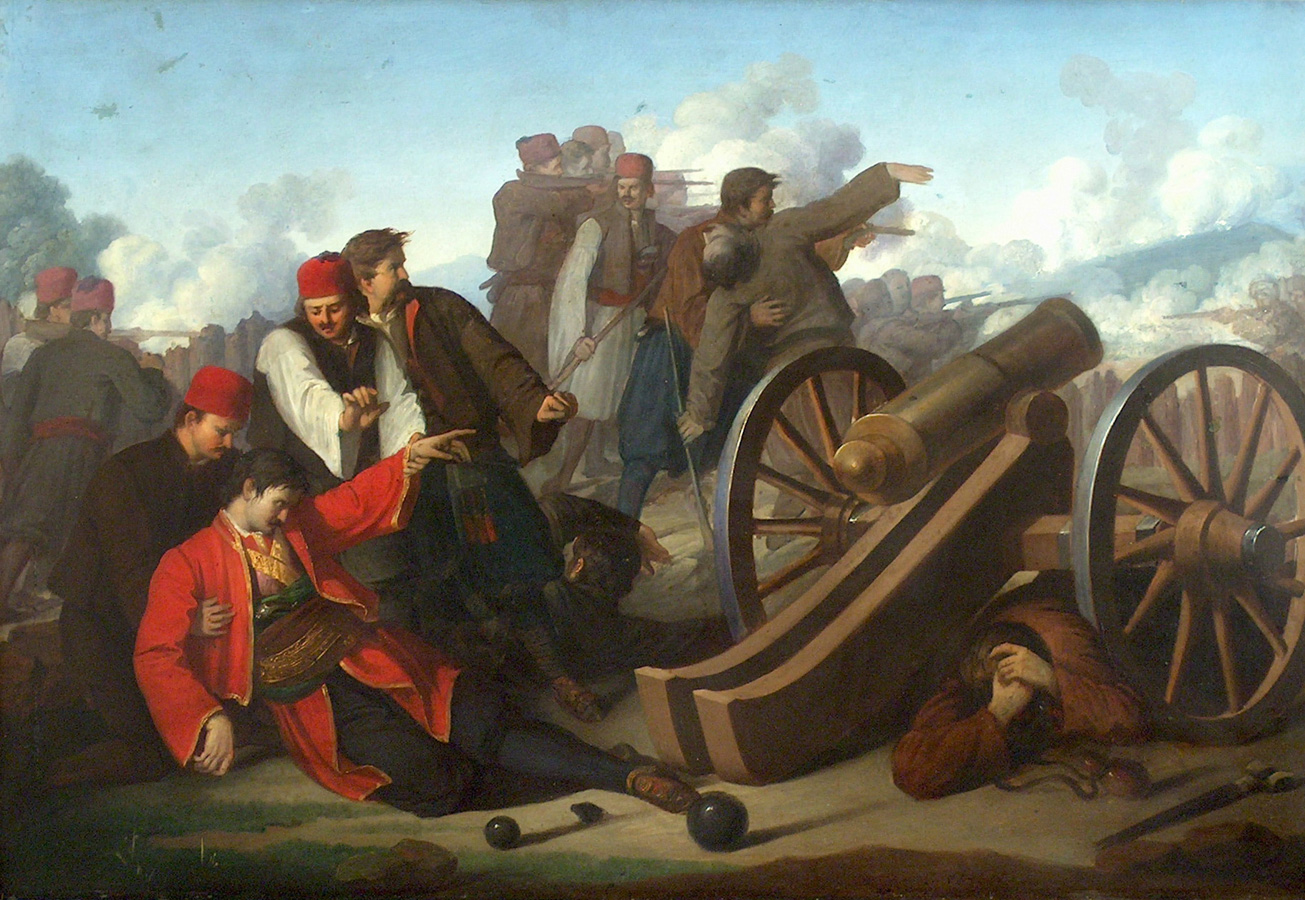
Death of Hajduk-Veljko, 1850

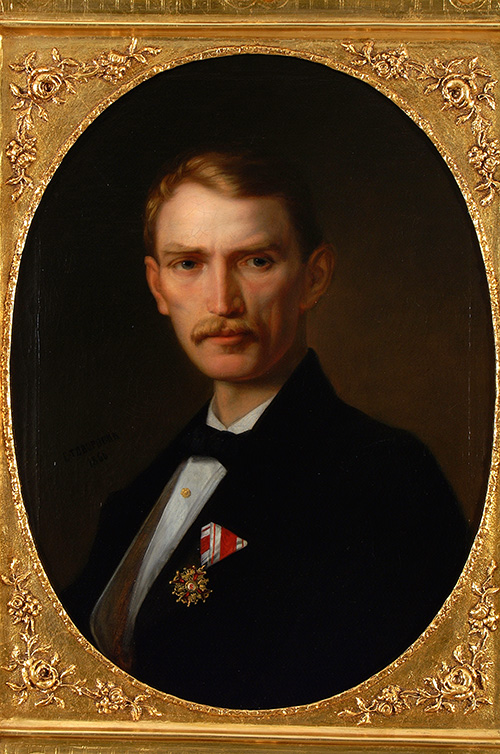
Portrait of Milan Đ. Milićević, National Museum of Serbia, 1866

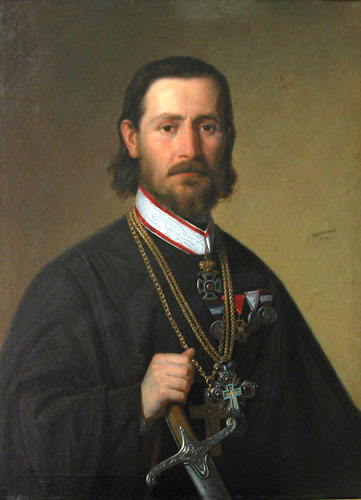
Portrait of Nićifor Dučić, 1874

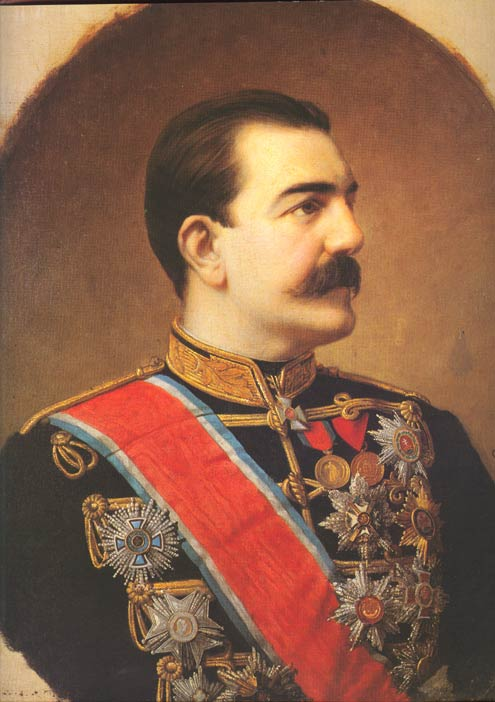
Portrait of king Milan Obrenović, 1883

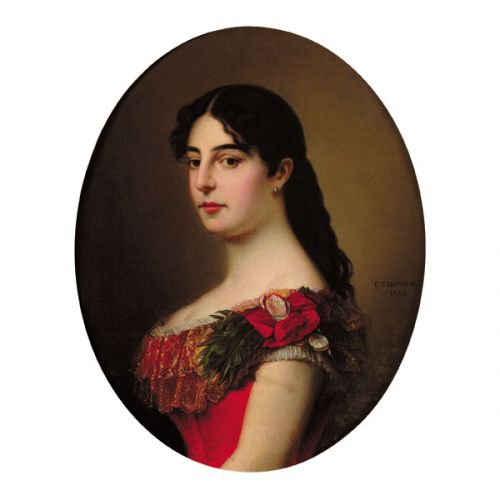
Reina Natalija de Serbia, 1883

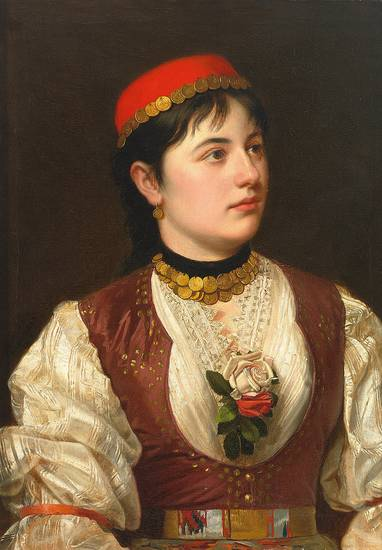
Polekonia Tolorovitschka, 1889

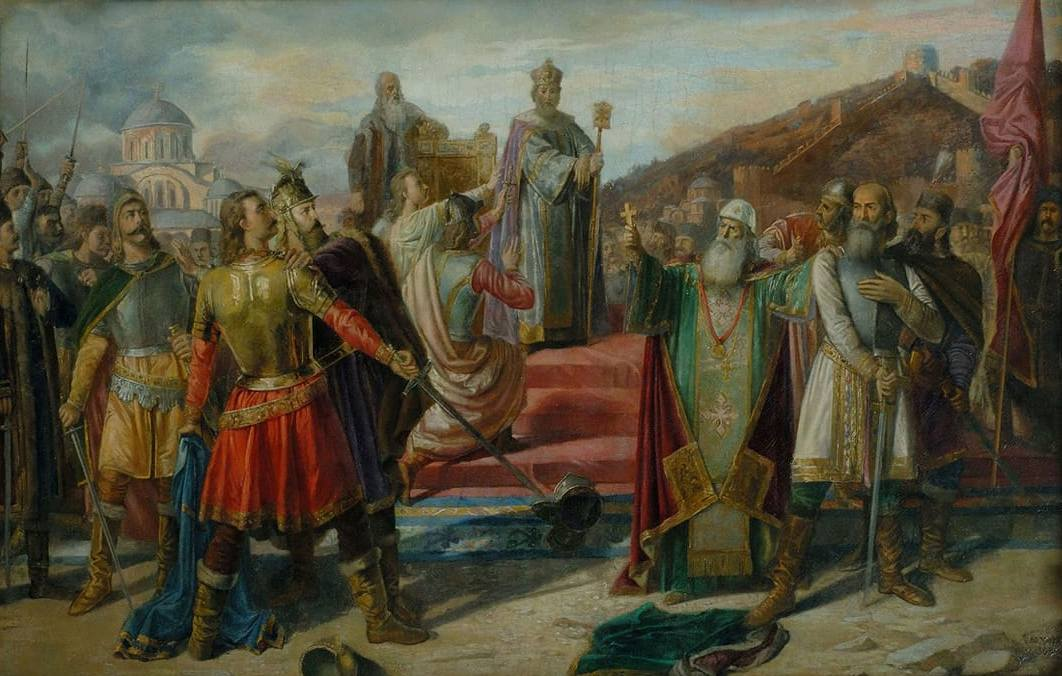
Sabor u Prizrenu, 1899

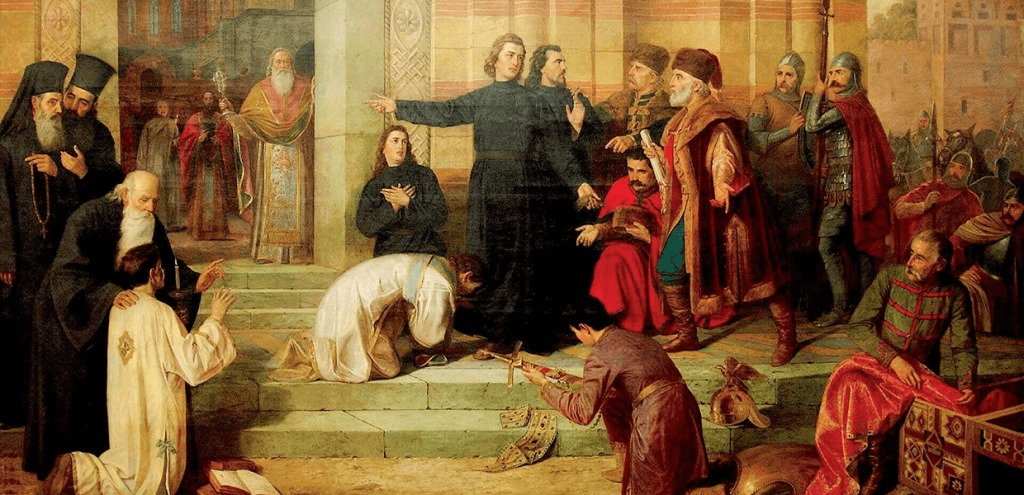
Postriženje Svetog Save, 1907

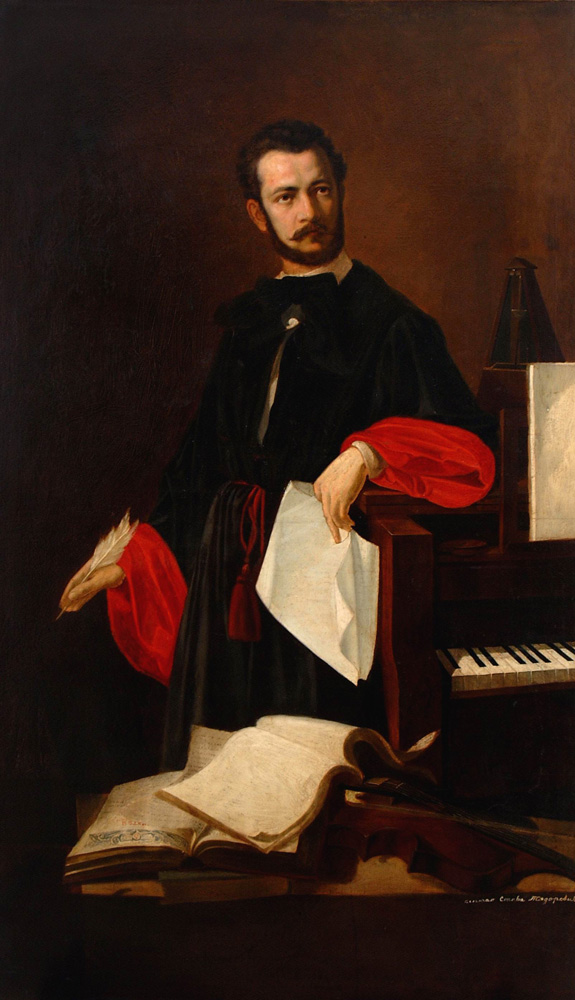
Portrait of composer Kornelije Stanković, 1920

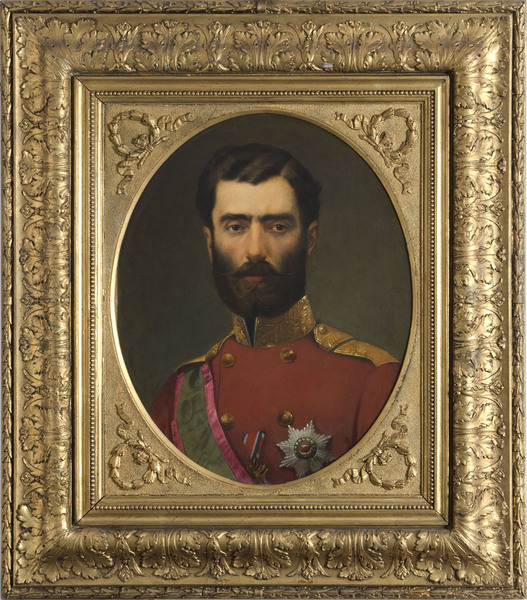
Portrait of Mihailo Obrenović

== See also ==
- List of painters from Serbia
- Serbian art
- Nikola Aleksić
- Đura Jakšić
- Novak Radonić
- Katarina Ivanović

== Sources ==
- Veljko Petrović; Zora Simić Milovanović (1950). Steva Todorović: 1832-1925 : izdanje Umetničkog muzeja, Beograd i Matice srpska, Novi Sad, 1950. Umetnički muzej.
