= Sovljak, Bogatić =

Sovljak Совљак (Serbian)
- Village (Selo)
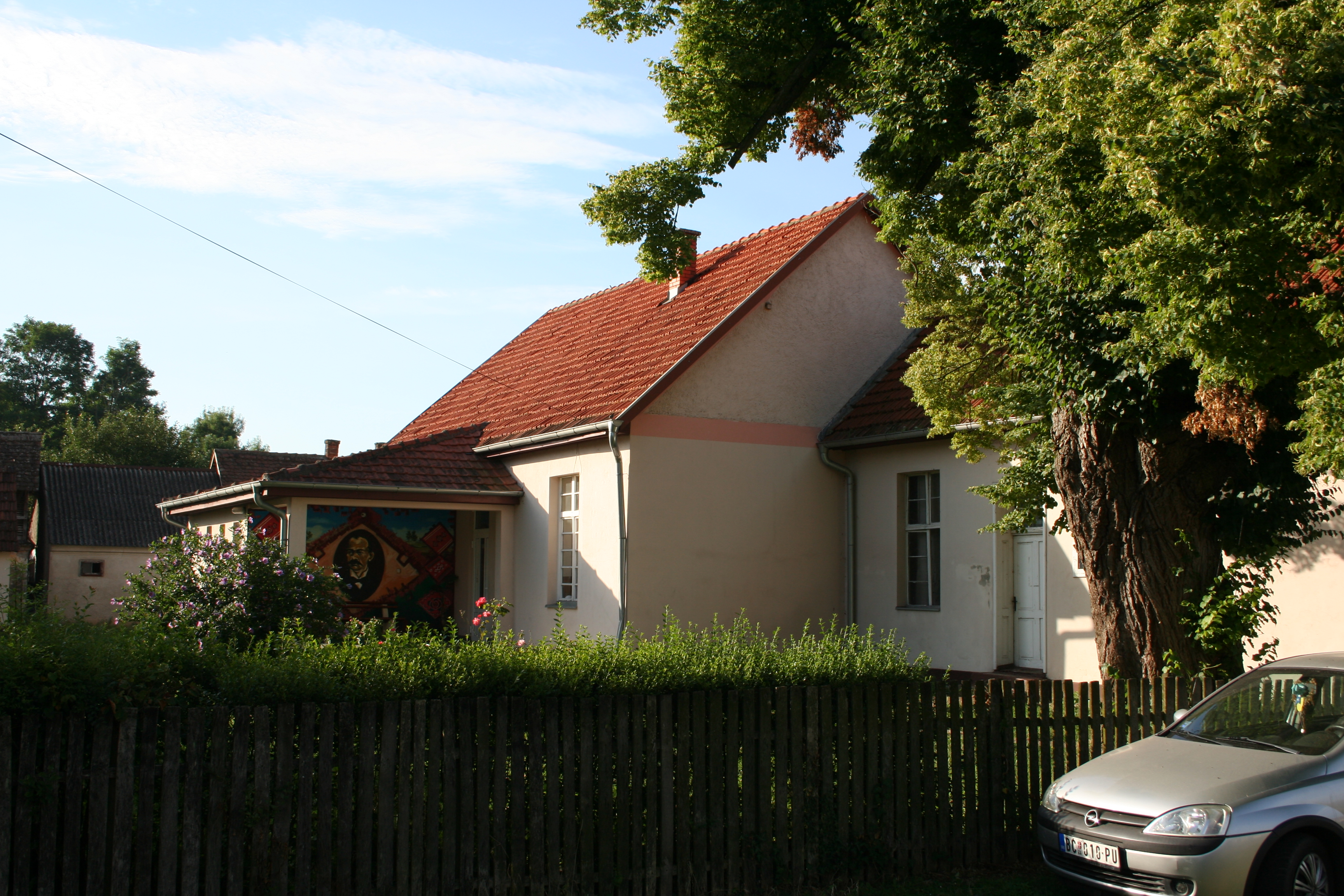

- Location within Serbia
- Country: Serbia
- Statistical Region: Šumadija and Western Serbia
- Region: Mačva
- District: Mačva District
- Municipality: Bogatić

Population (2011)
  - Total: 554
- Time zone: UTC+1 (CET)
  - Summer (DST): UTC+2 (CEST)

Historical population
| Year | Pop. | ±% |
|---|---|---|
| 1948 | 716 | — |
| 1953 | 719 | +0.4% |
| 1961 | 709 | −1.4% |
| 1971 | 662 | −6.6% |
| 1981 | 627 | −5.3% |
| 1991 | 648 | +3.3% |
| 2002 | 618 | −4.6% |
| 2011 | 554 | −10.4% |

Sovljak (Serbian: Совљак) is a village in Serbia. It is situated in the Bogatić municipality, in the Mačva District. The village has a Serb ethnic majority and its population numbered 554 people by the 2011 census.

== Characteristics ==
Sovljak is 5 km (3.1 mi) west from its municipal center, Bogatić. The village is one of the smallest in Mačva by population (second smallest in the municipality) but it is one of the oldest.

Sovljak is known for the village tourism. There is an ethno-park "Sovljak" in the typical architectural style of the area. The houses were built c.1920 and the entire yard, sort of an outdoor museum, covers 2 ha (4.9 acres). There is a lime tree in the yard, planted c.1910. One of the attractions in the village is and old style village house called osećanka, built in the late 19th century. Central room in the house is turned into the museum, and it makes one unit with the surrounding vajat (wooden summer house), barn, pergola and the outdoor masonry oven. The house used to have a sundial and now has an exhibition of the local naïve painters. The village is also setting of the August festivities of "Hajduk evenings" with the traditional ceremony of the "Mačva wedding" and the competition for the Harambaša.

== See also ==
- List of places in Serbia
- Mačva
