= Poleksija Todorović =

Serbian painter

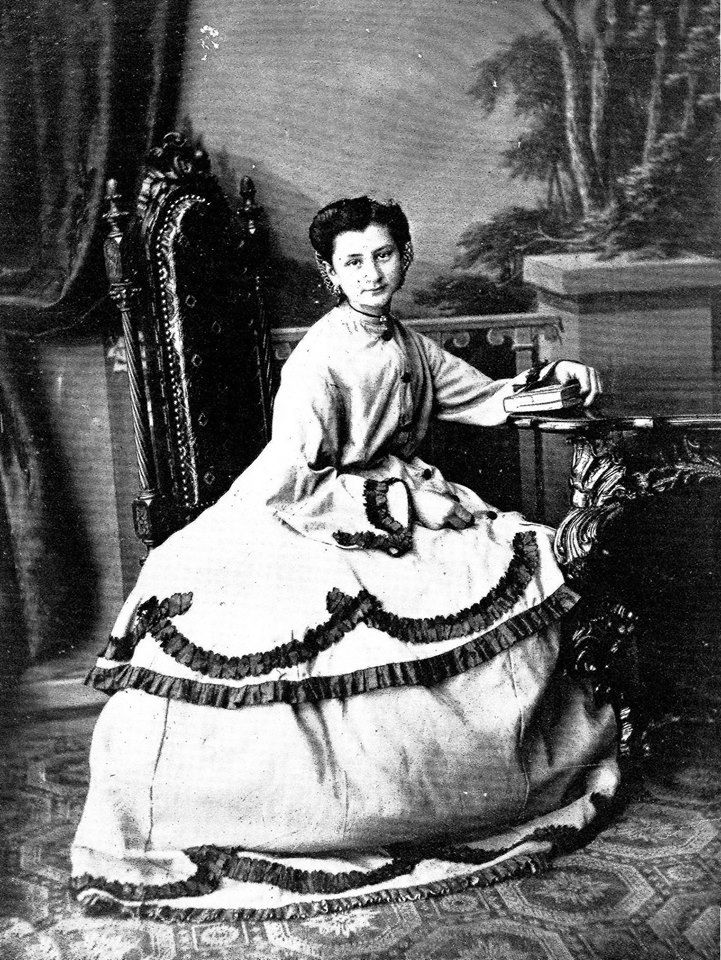
- Born: 3 April 1848; Belgrade, Principality of Serbia
- Died: 26 February 1939 (aged 90); Belgrade, Kingdom of Yugoslavia

Poleksija Todorović (1848–1939) was a Serbian painter.

== Life ==
She was born in Belgrade, Serbia, as Poleksija Ban, the daughter of Margarita Ban and Matija Ban, Serbian writer and diplomat. The beginnings of her painting are linked to the drawing school of Jovan Deroko, and later to her husband Stevan Todorović.

The Todorovićs traveled together to Florence and Rome, where they studied the works of Italian masters such as Raphael and Titian. They also worked jointly on numerous large historical and religious compositions.

Poleksija Todorović taught art at the Higher Women School in Belgrade for 15 years. In 1907, she was among the founders of the Serbian Art Association (Srpsko umetničko udruženje).

She died in 1939 and was survived by her youngest daughter Ljubica Todorović.

== Work and legacy ==
She mostly painted icons and portraits, sometimes landscapes, and worked on the iconostases in Church of the Nativity of the Virgin in Bogatić in 1871 and in the Holy Trinity Church in Negotin in 1901. Both sites are now protected as cultural monuments.

In 1880, she was the first Serbian woman to independently paint the entire iconostasis in the courtyard chapel of St. Natalia, at the Higher Women School in Belgrade, which was unfortunately destroyed during the First World War.

There are 16 of her paintings in the collection of the National Museum.

Alongside Katarina Ivanović and Mina Karadžić, she was one of the three Serbian women painters who worked in the 19th century.
