= Church of the Holy Trinity, Negotin =

Church of the Holy Trinity
- Саборна црква Свете Тројице
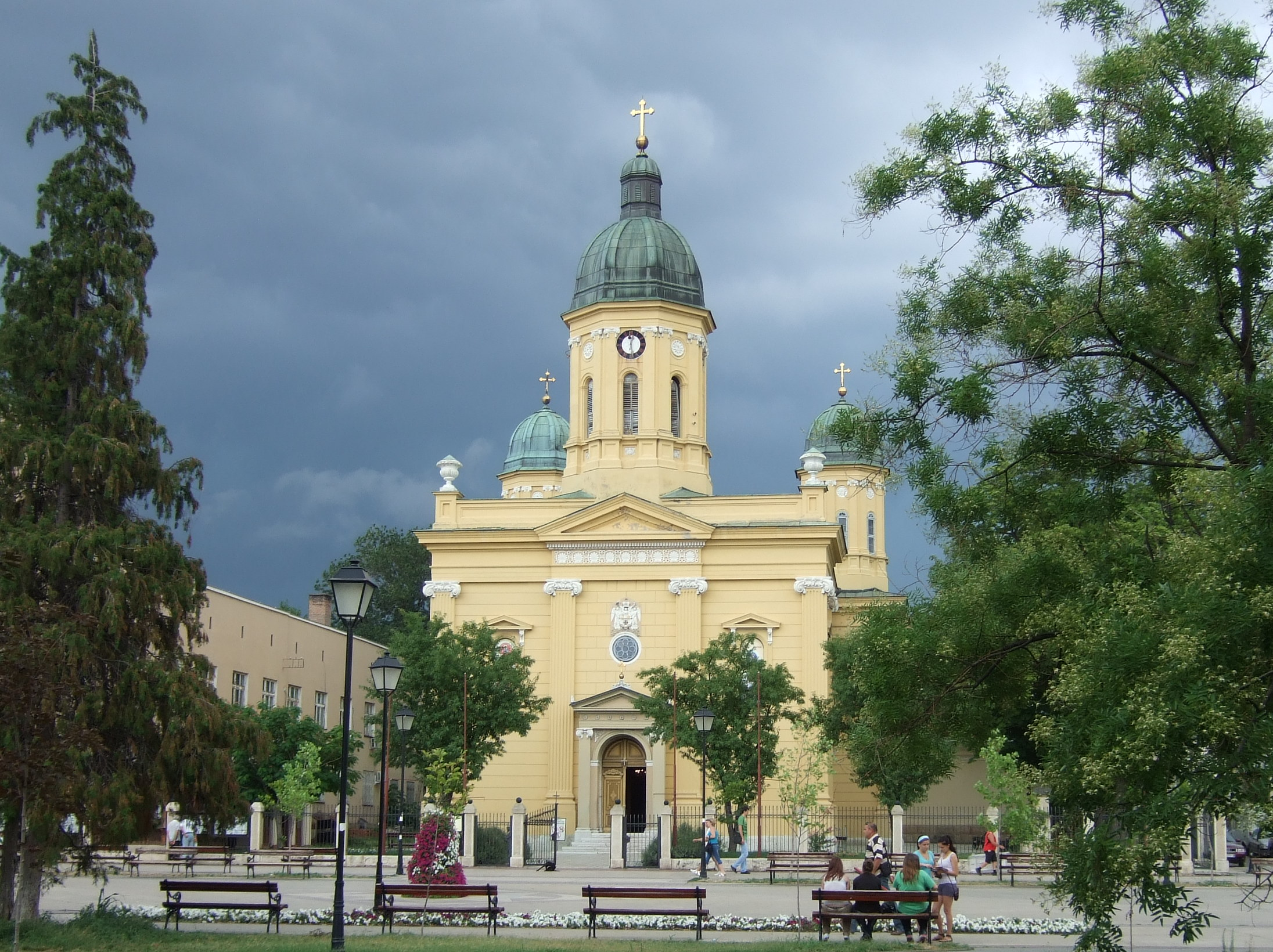
- Church of the Holy Trinity
- Church of the Holy Trinity
- 44°13′36″N 22°31′53″E
- Location: Negotin
- Country: Serbia
- Denomination: Serbian Orthodox

History
- Status: Church
- Dedication: Holy Trinity

Architecture
- Functional status: Active
- Years built: 1874; 152 years ago

Administration
- Archdiocese: Eparchy of Timok

The Church of the Holy Trinity (Serbian: Саборна црква Свете Тројице) in Negotin is a Serbian Orthodox cathedral in Serbia, serving as the seat of the Eparchy of Timok. The building is located in the centre of Negotin, at the corner of Stevan Mokranjac Square and Hajduk Veljko Street.

The church was designed by the Ministry of Construction of Serbia and was completed in 1874, with its consecration following in 1876. The architectural style of the church is predominantly Neoclassical with elements of Neo-Renaissance. The churchyard was enclosed with an iron fence in 1893, with stone columns made from sandstone from the Negotin area. Cannonballs from the Fetislam Fortress near Kladovo were used as decorative elements on the fence posts. The iconostasis and frescoes, created in 1901, were the work of the academic painter Stevan Todorović, who collaborated with his wife, Poleksija.

The church was designated as a protected cultural monument by the Republic Institute for the Protection of Cultural Monuments on June 2, 1967,

== See also ==
- Timok Valley
