= Nićifor Dučić =

Bosnian Serb theologian, historian (1832–1900)

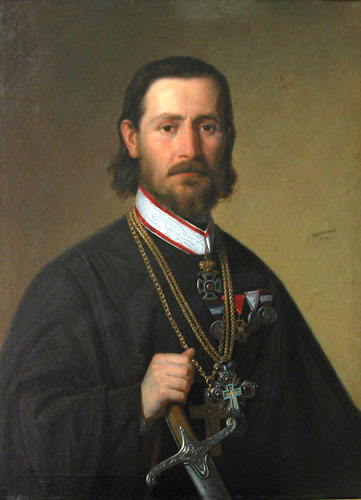
- A portrait of Dučić by Stevan Todorović from 1874
- Born: 21 November 1832; Trebinje, Ottoman Empire
- Died: 5 March 1900 (aged 67); Belgrade, Serbia
- Occupations: archimandrite, theologian, historian, writer, military commander, academic

Archimandrite Nićifor Dučić (Serbian Cyrillic: Нићифор Дучић; 1832–1900), was a Bosnian Serb theologian, historian, philologist, archimandrite, writer and academic.

As Archimandrite of Herzegovina Nićifor Dučić founded the Orthodox Seminarium in Cetinje in 1863. In 1880 Dučić was appointed as the head of the National Museum of Serbia, and since 1883 as a Director of National Library of Serbia.

Dučić's monographs about monasteries (Tvrdoš, Žitomislić, Morača, Ostrog) have not lost the cultural-historical value since science must further take some studies into consideration: Christmas in Montenegro (1867); Boka and Zeta (1875); Slav Manuscripts in the National Library in Paris (1889).

== Biography ==
Nićifor Dučić was born in the village of Velji Lug, near Trebinje in southern Bosnia and Herzegovina, in 1832. He received an excellent education in Serbia, Serbian Vojvodina, and later in Paris. During the 1848 Revolution he joined the Austrians as a young volunteer, and after he returned to his native Herzegovina where at the Duži Monastery he took holy orders under the guidance of his uncle, the abbot (archimandrite). In 1858 he founded with Serafim Perović a school in Duži, and taught religion and history in Mostar. From late 1858 until 1860 he oversaw the Žitomislić Monastery, situated near the River Neretva. There he wrote several series of monographs, literary histories, archaeological questions, including the history of Metox Monastery Duži and Tvrdoš, Žitomislić Monastery, Hilandar Monastery, and about the Serbian community and the Serbian Orthodox Church of Saint Spiridon in downtown Trieste.

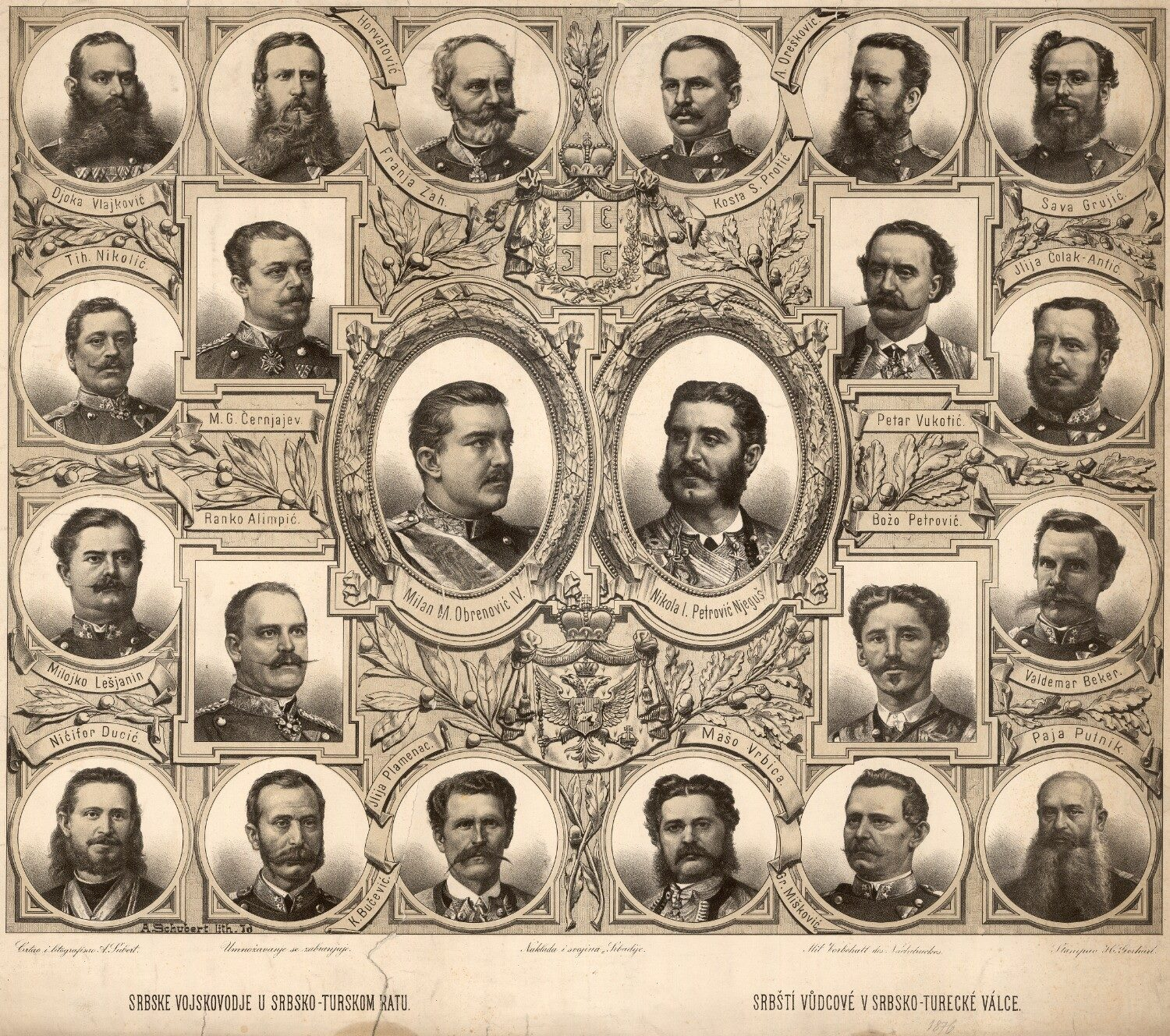
Serb military commanders in the Serbo-Turkish War, Dučić is presented on the bottom left.

In 1848 in Žitomislić Monastery was founded the first school for education of Serbian children and a school for education of Orthodox priests, which were established by monks of the manastir, chiefly Nićifor Dučić and Sirafin Perović.

Dučić himself served in his youth in the Herzegovinian Uprising of 1852-1862, led by Luka Vukalović. Dučić's strength, daring and activity fitted him to shine in operations largely composed of night marches, surprises, escalades, and hand-to-hand combat. The main scene of his achievement was in Bosnia and Herzegovina and when those hostilities died down, and there was no amnesty forthcoming from the Ottoman Porte and Constantinople as promised, Dučić left for Montenegro. He had a relation in Cetinje where he settled in 1864. There he was elevated to the rank of archimandrite, and he also helped Serafim Perović, his old friend from Duži, start a school of higher learning. When Perović opened the first seminary at Cetinje, Dučić was named rector. He wrote and published the rules of the school. Conditions for the pupils were favourable, with particular considerations for the poorest among them. He also entered into Montenegrin service, and was immediately nominated to head a diplomatic mission as an intermediary between Cetinje and Belgrade.

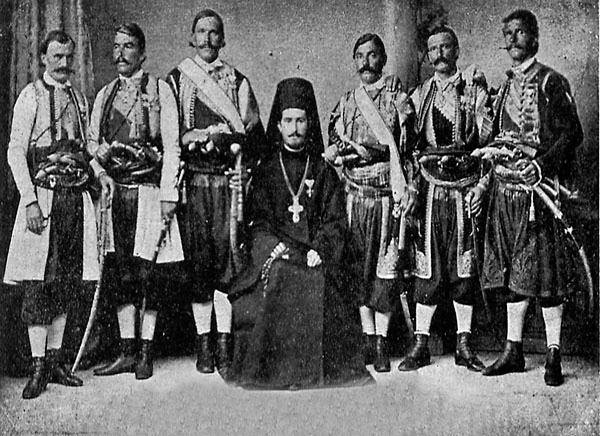
Nićifor Dučić with Montenegrin nobles, 1876.

Returning with general Milojko Lešjanin, Nićifor Dučić, now Nicholas I of Montenegro's envoy, exchanged copies of a treaty with Mihailo Obrenović III, Prince of Serbia and Prime Minister Ilija Garašanin signed October 14, 1867. Its stated purpose was to "prepare an insurrection in Turkey and unite the entire Serbian people in a single state." His pamphlets and revolutionary doctrines (that came to Austrian and Turkish attention) compelled him to leave Montenegro for Italy. In the meantime, Garašanin was preparing a general rising of all Serb lands against Turkish rule, and in 1868 Dučić was back in Belgrade. But the execution of Garašanin's plans was frustrated by the assassination of Prince Mihailo (Obrenović) on 10 June 1868 (or 28 May 1868 O.S.). Dučić was long a warm advocate of the political union of Bosnia and Herzegovina, Montenegro, Serbian Vojvodina, Kosovo Metohija, and Serbia.

With the accession of Prince Milan I of Serbia, the newly appointed prime minister Jovan Ristić employed Dučić for secret missions on behalf the Government, such as negotiating with the Turks. During September 1873, as Ristić's envoy, Dučić held consultations with Croatian politicians Matija Mrazović and Franjo Rački about the unification of all Serbian people with Serbia.

Nicifor Dučić and count Petar Vukotić had become champions of the idea of friendship and alliance with Serbia and favoured the unification of Montenegro with Serbia. They and Prince Nicholas believed that Montenegro's policy must be subject to Serbia's and that Serbian nation's salvation lays in complete unification with the rest of lands inhabited by Serbs. Filip Hristić arrived in Cetinje from Belgrade to assure Prince Nicholas that Serbia will back Montenegro in case of war with Turkey. Soon the war was declared in 1876 by Serbia in alliance with Montenegro in order to profit by the new insurrection in the Herzegovina which had begun in the summer of 1875 at Nevesinje. Dučić's love of adventure led him, during the First Serbo-Turkish War (1876–1878), to take the command of a brigade and enter into the fray. In this capacity he performed splendid service at Aleksinac, where he was wounded, by delaying Turkish advance on Belgrade before a conclusion of peace could be drawn up. The final result of the war which intensified the Balkan crisis culminated in the Russo-Turkish War (1877-1878). By the settlement of the conflict Serbia and Montenegro acquired their respective and total independence from the Ottoman Empire. He died at Belgrade in 1900.

He was awarded several medals for bravery, Order of Saint Sava, Order of Miloš the Great, Order of the White Eagle, Order of the Cross of Takovo, Order of Saint Vladimir and Bulgarian Order for civil service.

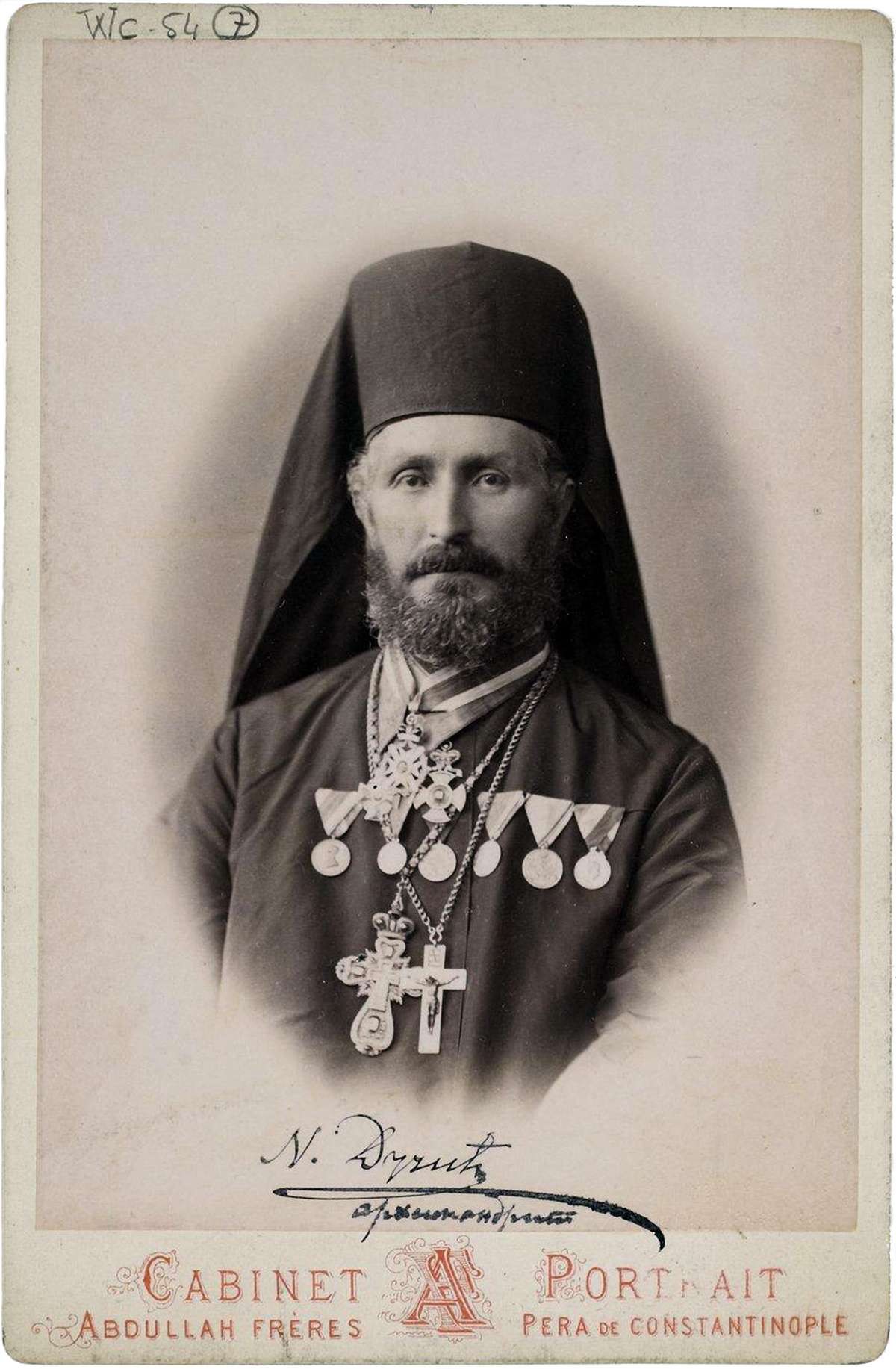
Nićifor Dučić in 1885

== Works ==
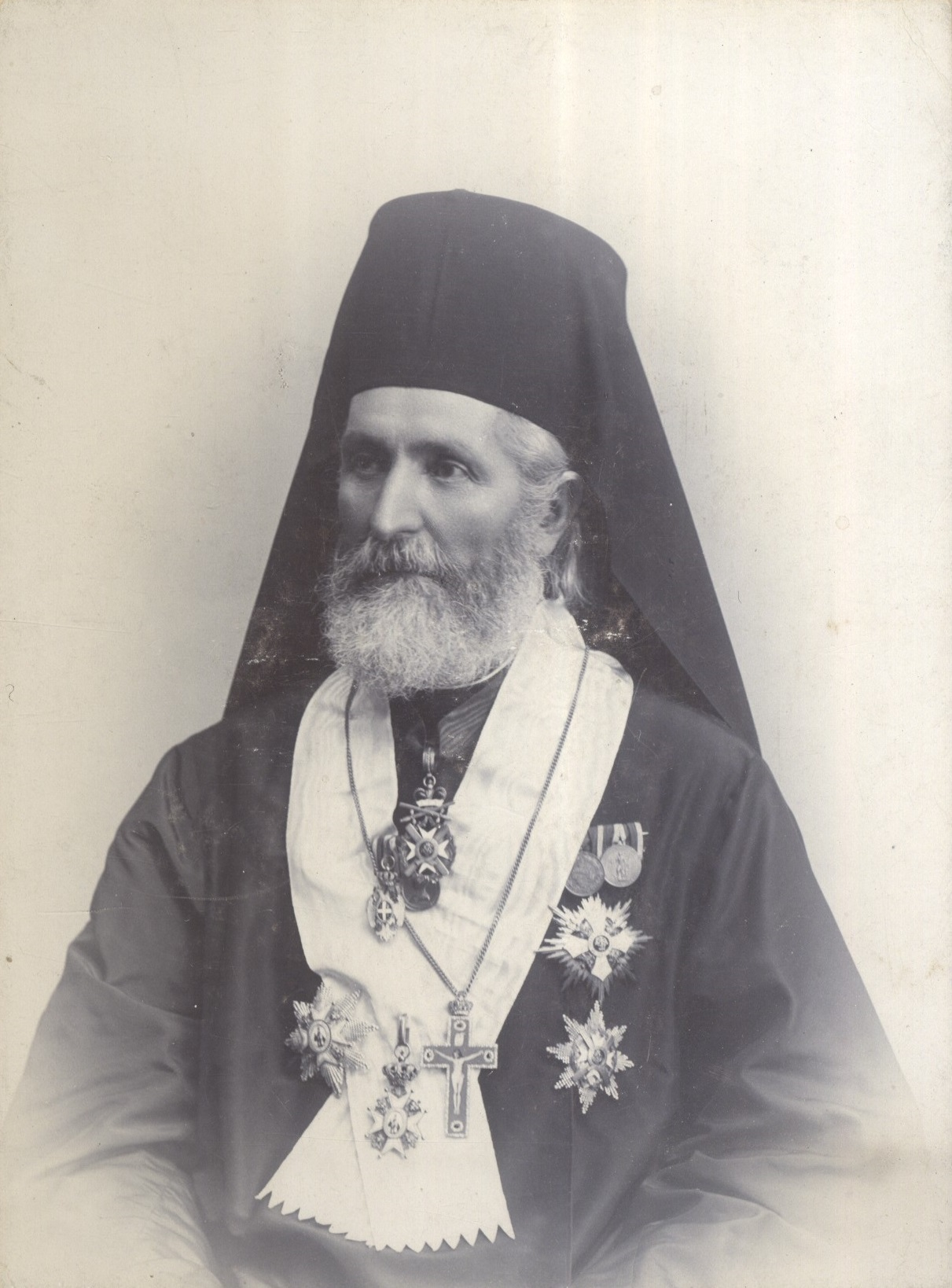
Nićifor Dučić, 1899.

Though one of the most remarkable of Serbian writers, historians and diplomatists, Nićifor Dučić laboured for many years in comparative obscurity. Dučić began to write early, and had, according to his own account, composed several articles when he was sixteen. As a contributor to newspapers and magazines, he came under the notice of Ilarion Ruvarac, who encouraged him to continue to produce well-researched historical monographs for learned societies and their periodicals and journals. He wrote a treatise about Serbs living in the port city of Trieste, entitled "The Serbian Parish in Trieste".

Njegoš's poetic works remained practically unrecognized and unnoticed by our littérateurs for more than two decades, until Nićifor Dučić wrote: Primjetbe na "Komentar Gorskog vijenca" (Belgrade, Državna Štamparija, 1870).

Dučić once complained: The Greek metropolitans ordain as clergy even such people as can hardly read the church books. (Istorija srpske pravoslavne crkve od prvijeh desetina VII viejeka to nasih dana, Beograd, 1892).

In 1869 Dučić became a member of the a Serbian Learned Society, and for a time held the post of director (librarian) of the Serbian National Library, from 1880 to 1886.

Between 1891 and 18 99 Dučić himself published his collected works with total of nine books. The study The Old Times of Hilandar and the Monograph of Hilandar was published in 1884 and then it was included into the fourth book of collected works in 1895.

== Bibliography ==
- Junački spomenik o najnovijim tursko-crnogorskim bojevima“ (1864), poslovice, doskočice, pripovetke i pesme iz Crne Gore
- Pokušaj statističkoga opisa trebinjskoga, prijepoljskoga, pljevaljskoga i nevenjskoga
- Narodno predanje o Nikšićima
- Koliko ima vrela u Treskavici
- Božić u Crnoj Gori
- Crna Gora
- Putovanje po Crnoj Gori
- Borba dobrovoljačkoga kora ibarske vojske 1876. i ustaških četa javorskoga kora 1877—1878
- Monografija Tvrdoša (Trebinje), 1859
- Monografija Žitomislića
- Vranjine u Zeti i hrisovulje u Cetinju
- Hronograf žitomišljićski
- Morača i Ostrog
- Krčmija moračka
- Dobrušta
- Episkopija zetska i dabarska
- Srpski arhanđelski manastir u Jerusalimu
- Slovenski rukopisi u Narodnoj biblioteci u Parizu
- Humska prvoslavna episkopija od 1220—1346, poznije mitropolija
- Sveti Sava, srpska crkva i srpska kraljevina u XVIII vijeku“ pristupna beseda
- Starine hilandarske i monografija Hilandara
- Petrov manastir u Trebinju
- Književni radovi arhimadrita Nićifora Dučića“ (1891—1899), I-IX

Cultural offices
Preceded by Jovan Bošković	Director of National Library of Serbia; 1880–1886	Succeeded by Milan Đ. Milićević
Preceded by Jovan Bošković	Director of National Museum of Serbia; 1880–1881	Succeeded by Miloje Vasić
