= Milan Kostić =

Theologian, lawyer, teacher, director, ordained priest, archbishop of Bečej

Milan Kostić Милан Костић
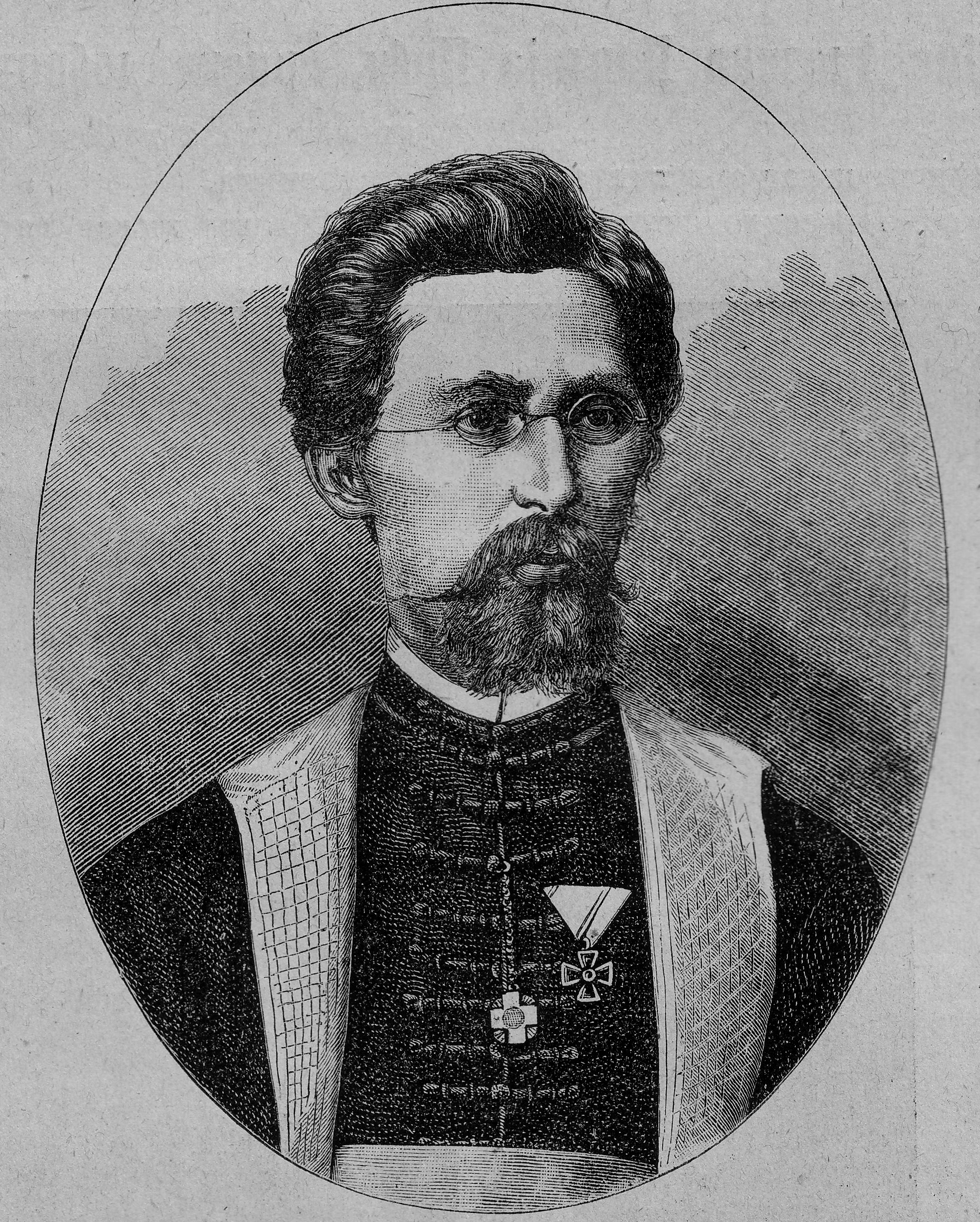
- Church: Serbian Orthodox Church

Personal details
- Born: 1839 Sivac near Kula
- Died: July 22, 1880 Bečej
- Denomination: Orthodox Christian

Milan Kostić (Serbian Cyrillic: Милан Костић; Sivac near Kula, 1839 - Bečej, July 22, 1880) was a Serbian Orthodox professor, theologian, translator and rector of the Cetinje Seminary.

== Education ==
He comes from a priest family. He finished primary school in Petrovaradin, high school in Vrbas, Sremski Karlovci and Budimu (1851–1859) and Theological Seminary "St. Arsenije Sremac" in Sremski Karlovci (1859–1863). He studied law in Pest (1865–1867), where he was a member of the Serbian student society "Preodnica". Then in Kiev he attended the Theological Academy (1867–1869), where he obtained a master's degree in theology.

== Cetinje seminary and foundation of Montenegro education ==
At the invitation of Prince Nikola Petrović, and on the recommendation of Prote Rajevskog, he went to Montenegro, and founded and edited the Cetinje seminary (1869). He was a professor, rector and supervisor of Montenegro's schools. Together with Rajevski, he compiled the Constitution of the Cetinje seminary, the curriculum, as well as several textbooks and manuals. He initiated the founding of the literary society "Crnogorski borac" in the Cetinje seminary. He left Cetinje after finishing the school year 1871–1872. due to material and health reasons, but also due to intrigues at the Montenegrin court.

In 1871, for his contribution to the education of Montenegro, he was awarded the Order of Daniel I, III degree .

== Return ==
Upon his return to his homeland, he worked as a professor at the state high school in Sombor (1872–1874). He was ordained a priest in 1874 in Sentandreji, and in August of the same year he was elected archpriest in Becej.

== Social and political engagement ==
He was the president of the Serbian Reading Room, a member of the Consistory of the Diocese of Bačka and the school's Bačka Board, a member of the Patronage Serbian Orthodox High School in Novi Sad, a member of Ujedinjene omladine srpske and a member of the Board of its sixth Assembly in Vršac. He died of tuberculosis.

== Literary, theological and translation work ==
He wrote articles in theology, journalism and literature. He spoke Serbian, German, Russian, French, Hungarian, Latin, Greek and Church Slavonic. He collaborated in Danica, Javor, Srpskoj zori, Starmalom Rodoljubu, Pedagogijumuand Školskom list.

He translated plays A. Bana, W. Shakespeare and M. В. Karnjeva. The most significant translation is "The Tempest" by Shakespeare, which was translated from German to Serbian and premiered in Serbian National Theatre in 1874.

For the work "Schools in Montenegro" he received monetary award Serbian Academy in the amount of 30 ducats.

== Bibliography ==
- Speech by Milan Kostić: during his production for Proto Staro-Bečejski: in Bečej on October 8 (20), 1874. (Novi Sad, 1874)
- Schools in Montenegro: from the earliest times to the present day (Pancevo, 1876)
- Translated from German by "Tamed Goropad"
