= Ethno Park in Sovljak =

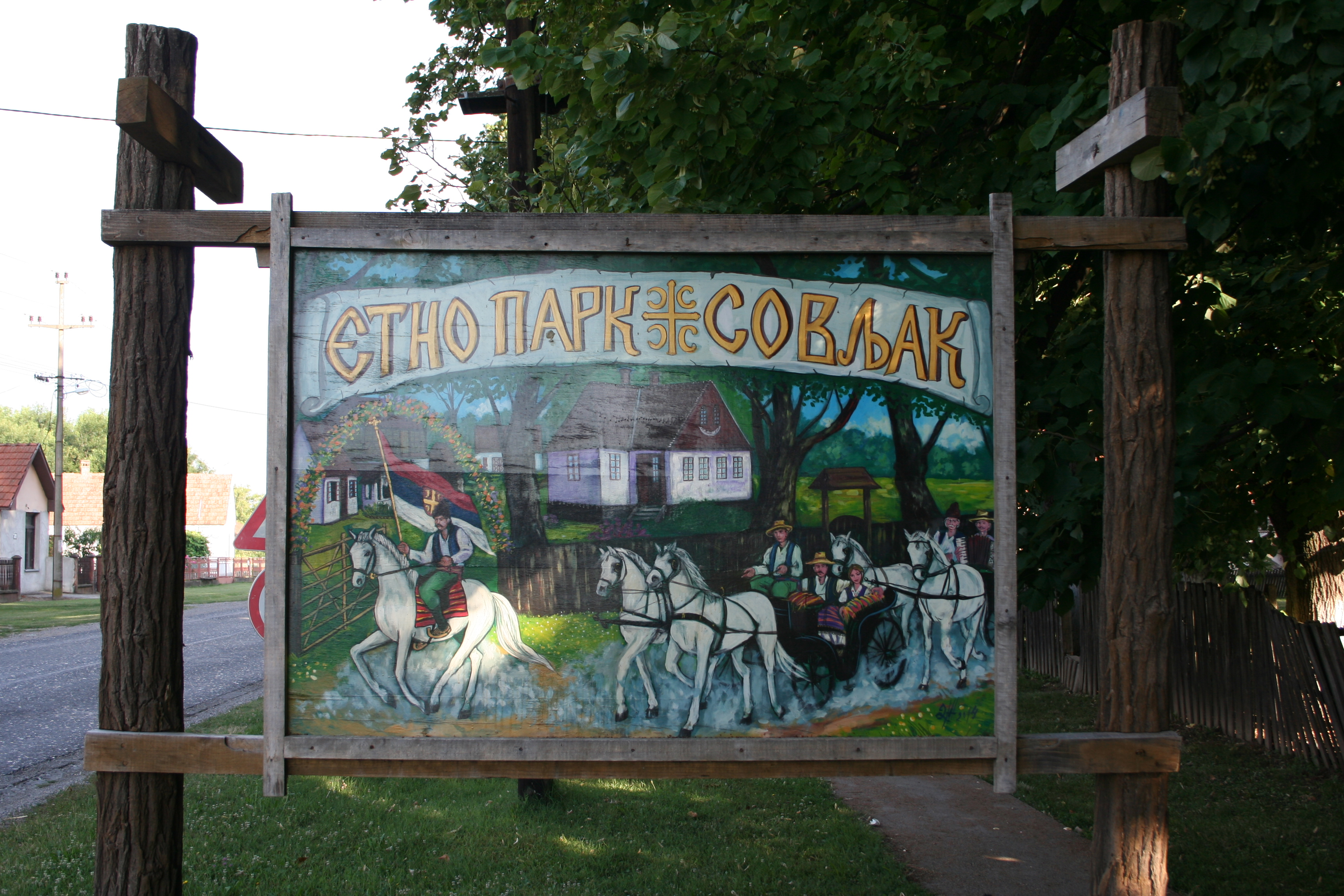
Signage for the park in 2016

The Ethno Park in Sovljak is an ethnic reconstruction park located in Bogatić, Serbia. It consists of multiple buildings: houses, a granary, a barn, a wheelwright's shop, a bread oven and a porch for agricultural tools.

It was established in 1971 on an area of 2 hectares, with an authentic display of traditional folk architecture, complete interior furnishings and craft products, of both artistic and economic character, as well as many items related to everyday rural life. The content of the ethno park includes examples of ten typical buildings, including a Mačva house with a yard as they were built at the end of the 19th and the beginning of the 20th century.

== Hajduk Night ==
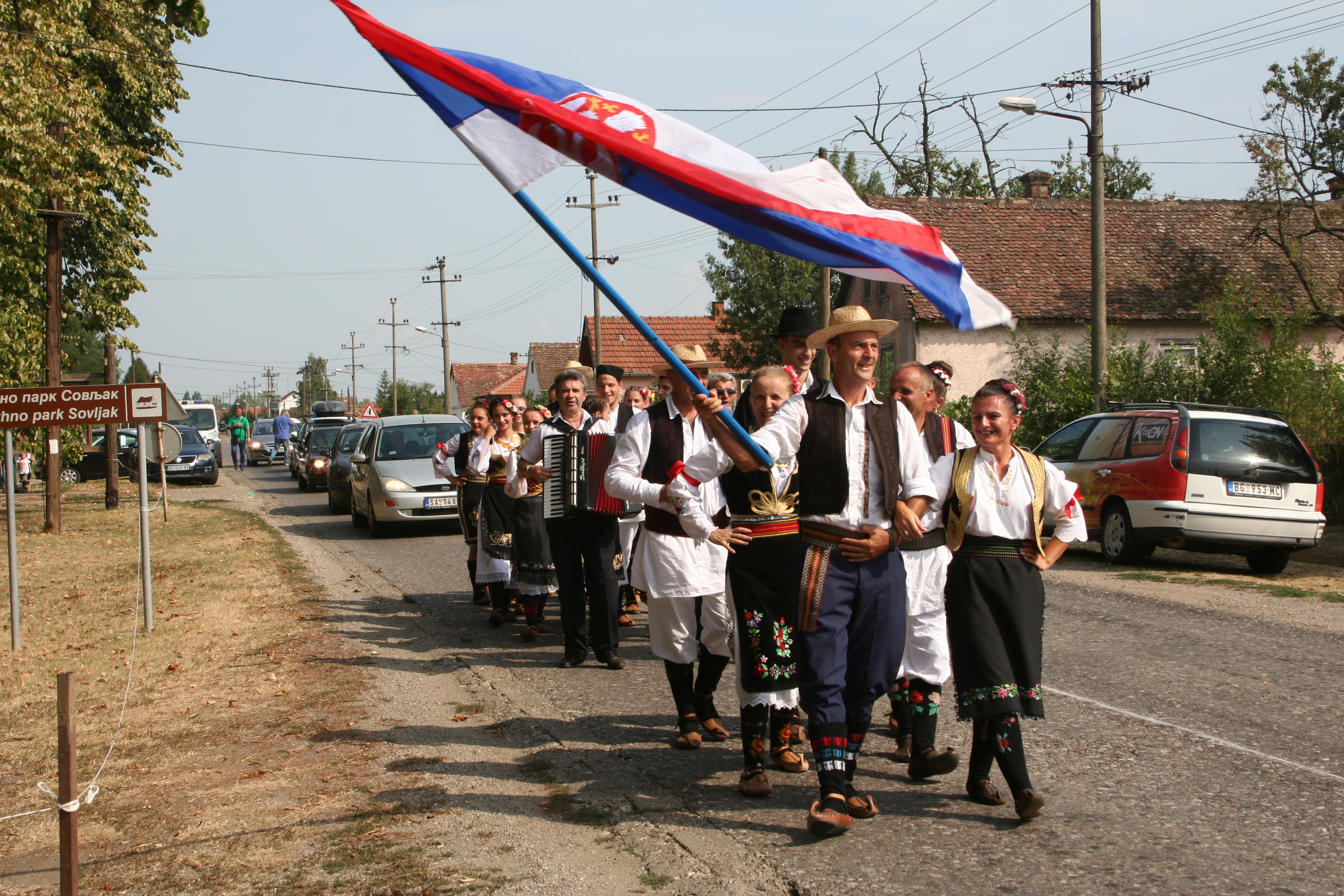

In the yard, part of a traditional wedding takes place every August as part of the tourist event Hajduk Night, where wedding guests come from Bogatić to collect the bride from the house.

== Appearance ==
Sovljak is located on the road from Bogatić to Crna Bara, five kilometers from the municipal center of Bogatić and equally distant from the river Drina. The Ethno Park features an authentic yard with a homestead that is over a hundred years old. The yard is dominated by a traditional house, built in the second phase of construction, in Mačva of the "osećanski" type, typical for that time – with two entrances, i.e., an entrance and an exit, and a sundial indicating the time. Next to the house is an old linden tree with a trunk diameter of 1.80 meters.

In the yard, there is a vajat (small house) where newlyweds traditionally began their life together, a granary whose upper part was used for storing corn, and the lower masonry part as a storage or basement. In the open sheds, transport vehicles such as chariots, carriages, carts and sleds were kept. Today, these means of transportation are preserved as museum exhibits. A wheat thresher serves as a reminder of past times and harvest customs.

Other preserved structures are the kiln where bread was baked and plums were dried in the fall and the granary where wheat, oats, and barley were stored in the past. The interior of the house is authentic for the past century. Inside, there is a bed, a low table, a loom, a baby walker, a cradle, a distaff and other household items. The house also contains a permanent exhibition of Mačva painters.

== Literature ==
- Institute for the Protection of Cultural Monuments Valjevo (2006). Spomeničko nasleđe Kolubarskog i Mačvanskog okruga. Valjevo. ISBN 978-86-904745-2-3. COBISS 131307532.
