= Gojko Perović =

Archpriest of the Serbian Orthodox Church

Gojko Perović Гојко Перовић
- Dean of Podgorica-Kolašin Deanery
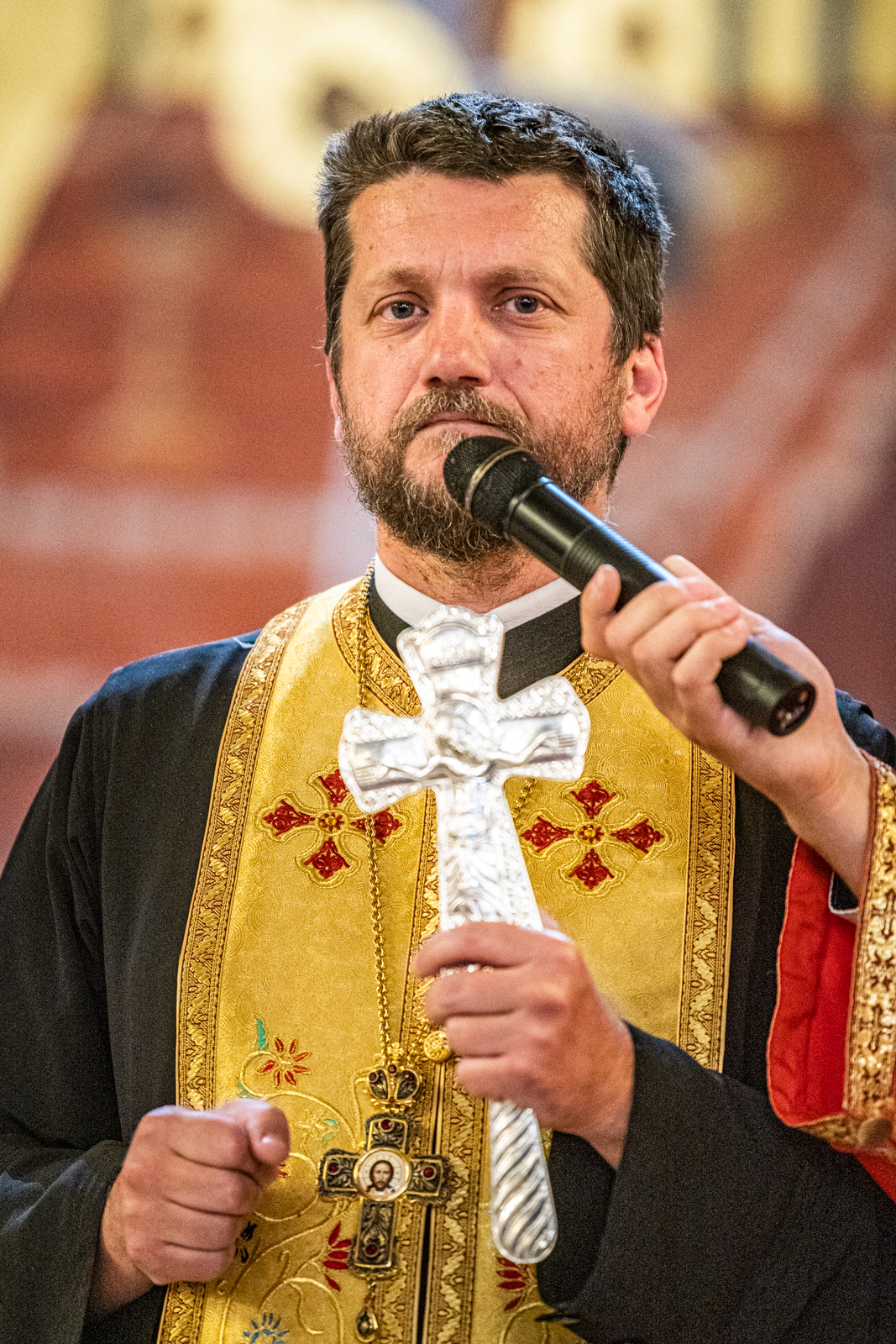
- Church: Serbian Orthodox Church
- Diocese: Metropolitanate of Montenegro and the Littoral
- Installed: Oct 1st, 2021

Orders
- Ordination: Oct 14th, 2000
- Rank: archpriest-stavrophore

Personal details
- Born: 1972 (age 53–54) Kotor
- Denomination: Eastern Orthodox Christian

Gojko Perović (Serbian Cyrillic: Гојко Перовић; born September 8, 1972) is archpriest-stavrophore of Serbian Orthodox Church, Dean of Podgorica-Kolašin Deanery, vicar of Church of St. George in Podgorica, and former Rector of Saint Peter of Cetinje Seminary.

== Biography ==
After graduating from a Gymnasium in Herceg Novi, he graduated in 1999 at the Faculty of Orthodox Theology in Belgrade and thereafter graduated in philosophy at the Faculty of Philosophy in Belgrade. He was ordained deacon in 1999, on The Sunday of Orthodoxy, and ordained priest on the Feast of Intercession of the Theotokos on October 14, 2000, in Cetinje Monastery. He was promoted to archpriest on the Feast of St. Luka, October 31st, 2003, and was awarded with the right to wear a pectoral cross on December 30, 2010. From October 10th, 1999, until the appointment of as the Rector at Cetinje seminary, he was the editor-in-chief of Radio Svetigora.

Perović has been teaching Biblical history and Pastoral theology at the Cetinje seminary since September 1st, 1998. At the May session of the Holy Synod of the Serbian Orthodox Church in 2002, at the suggestion of the Metropolitan of Montenegro and the Littoral Amfilohije, Perović was appointed as acting Rector of Cetinje Seminary, starting with September 1st, 2002, and appointed as permanent Rector in May 2016.

Perović was removed from the post of the Rector and appointed to the Church of St. George in Podgorica at the end of July 2021. On Oct 1st, 2021, he was appointed the Dean of Podgorica-Kolašin Deanery.

== See also ==
- Theological Seminary of St. Peter of Cetinje
