= Glušci, Serbia =

Glušci Глушци (Serbian)
- Village (Selo)
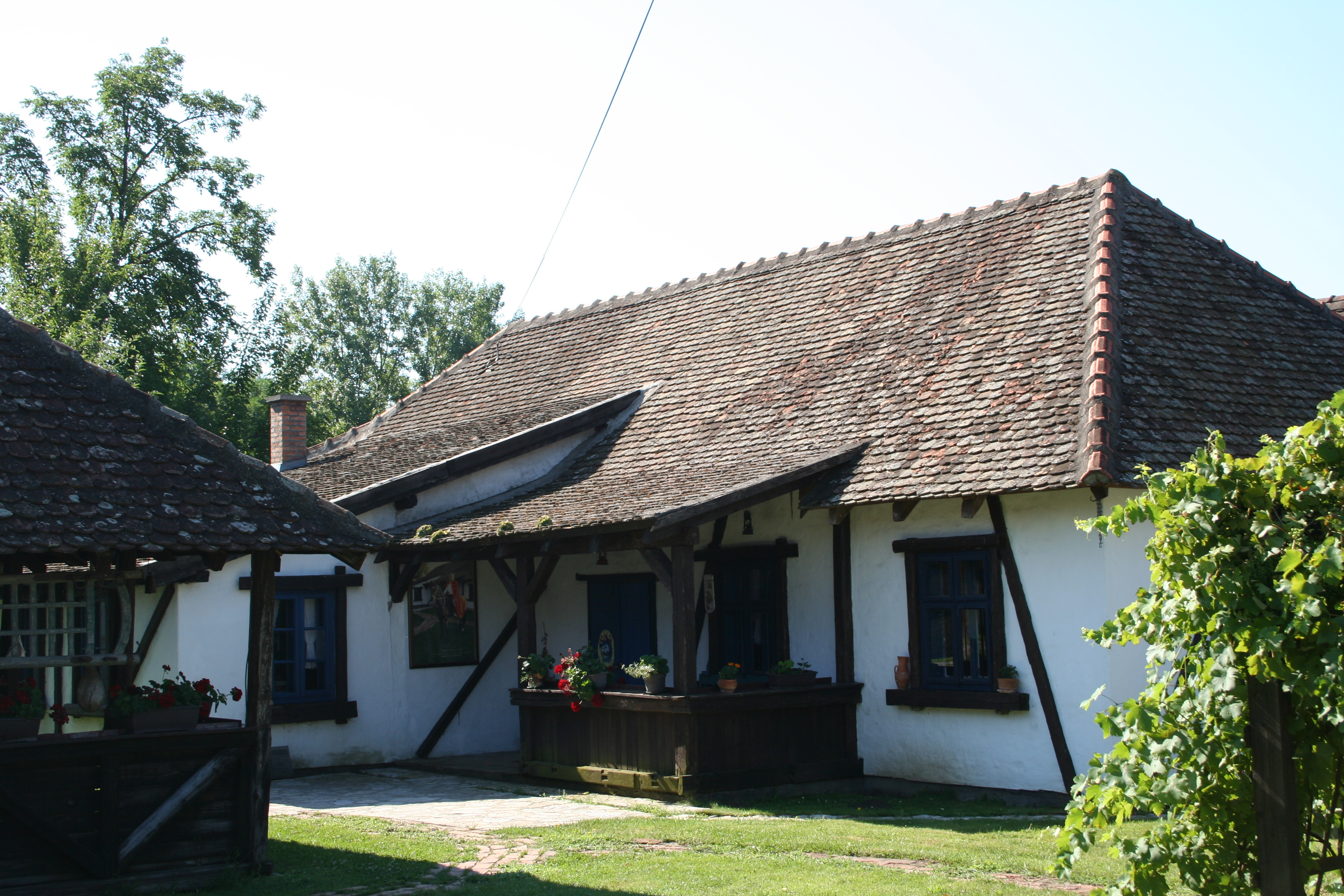
- Ethno Garden

- Location within Serbia
- Coordinates: 44°53′16″N 19°32′32″E
- Country: Serbia
- Statistical Region: Šumadija and Western Serbia
- Region: Mačva
- District: Mačva District
- Municipality: Bogatić
- Time zone: UTC+1 (CET)
  - Summer (DST): UTC+2 (CEST)

Glušci (Serbian Cyrillic: Глушци [ɡlǔːʃtsi]) is a village in Serbia. It is situated in the Bogatić municipality, in the Mačva District. The village has a Serb ethnic majority and its population numbering 2,346 people (2002 census).

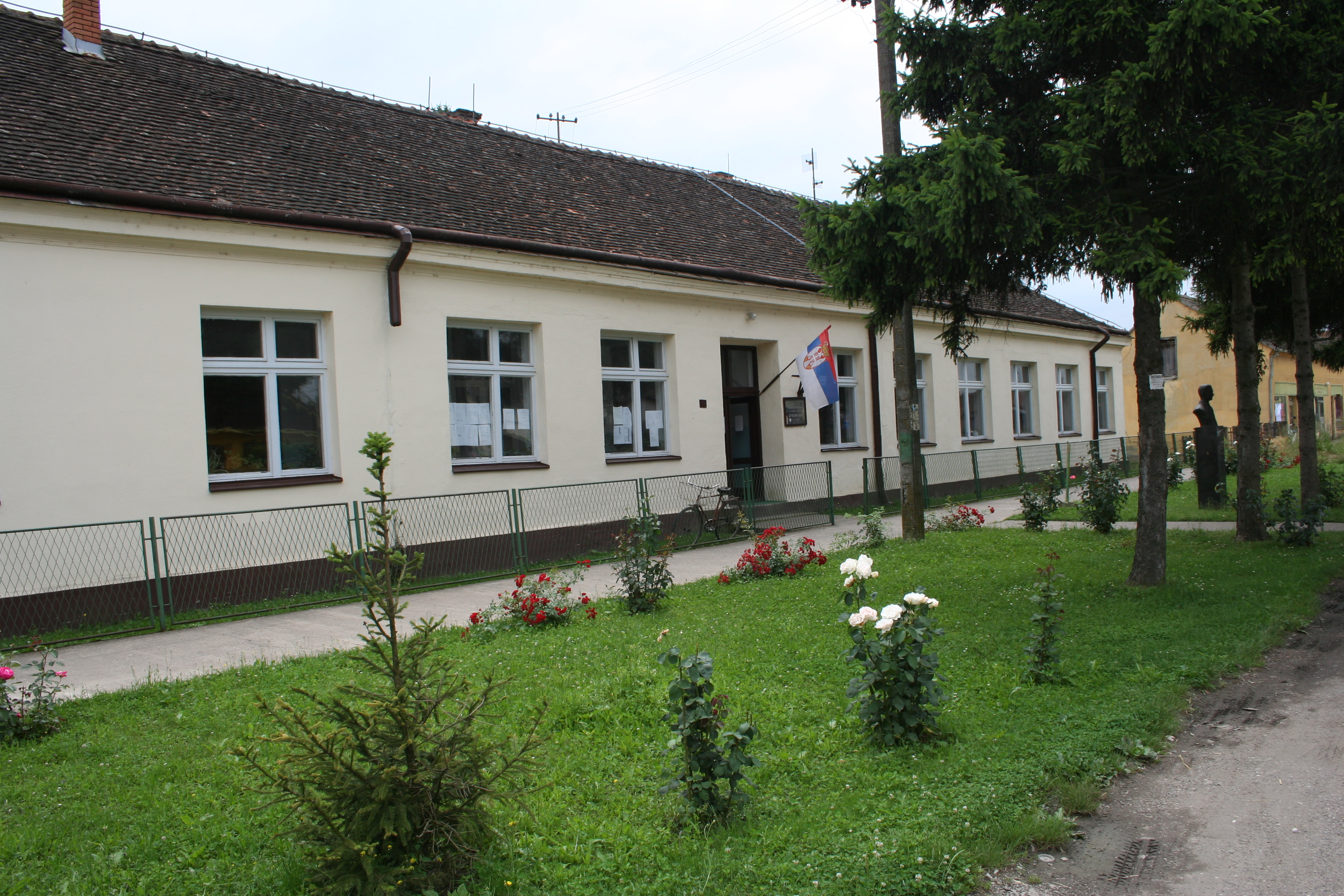
Elementary school

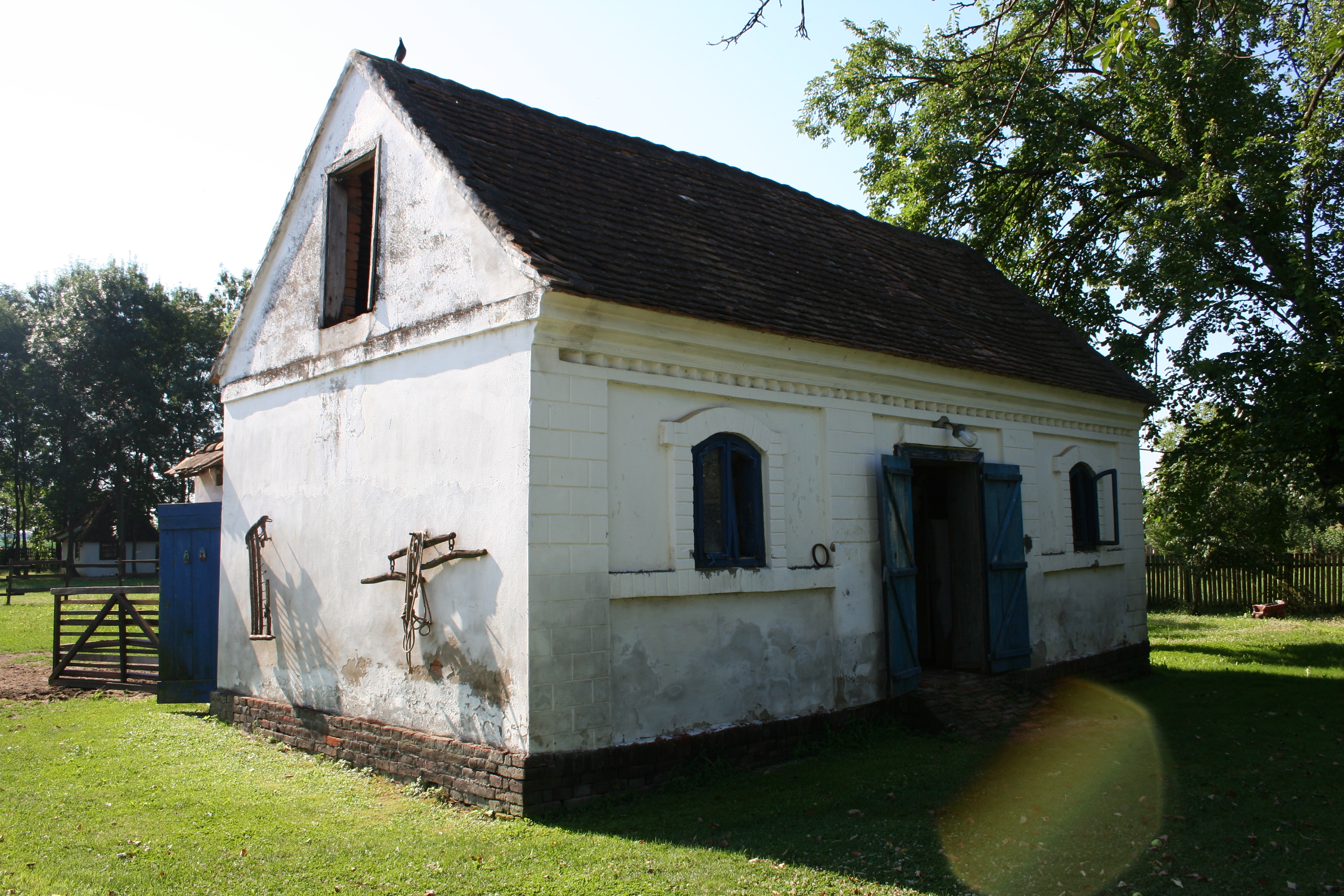
Ethno Garden

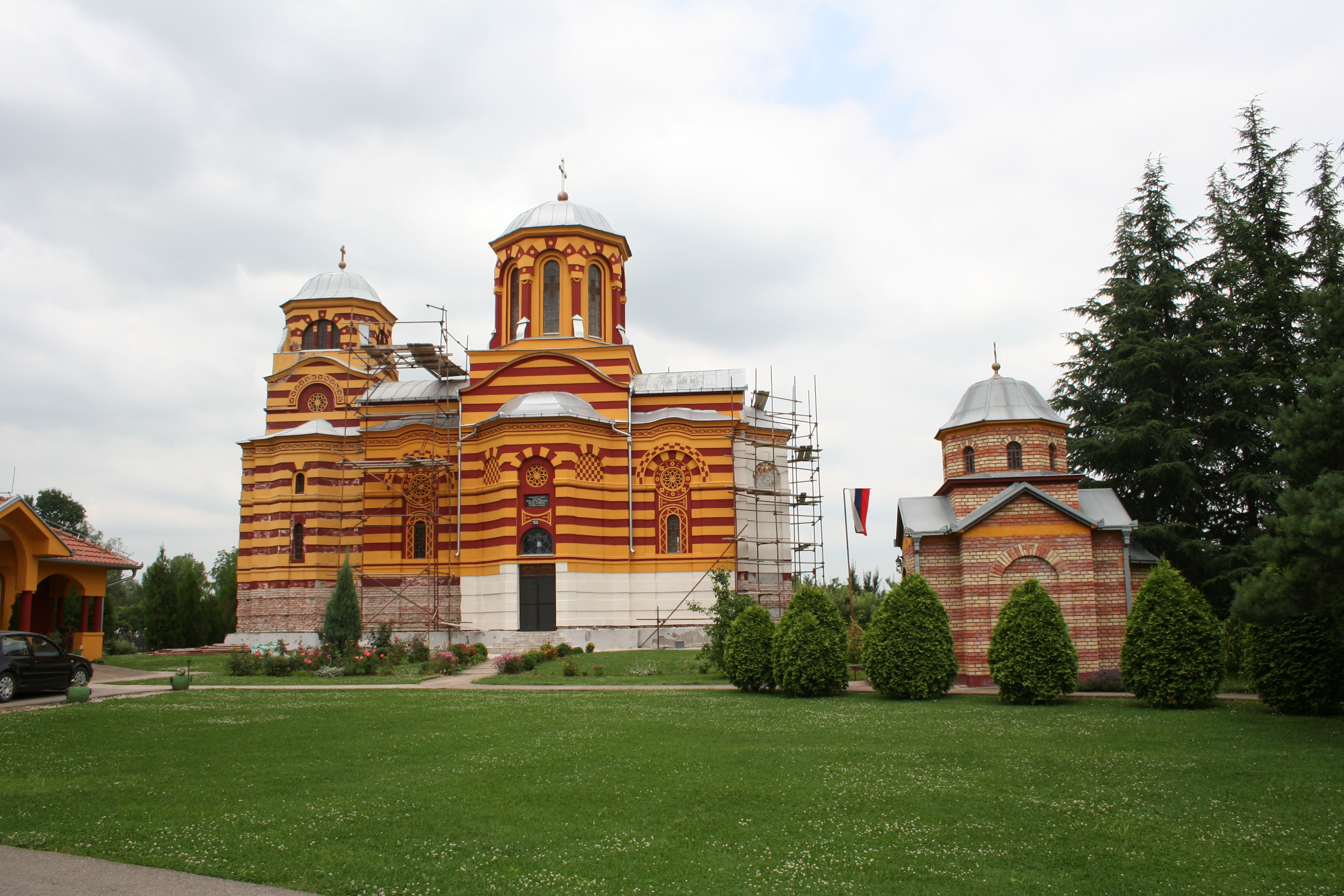
Orthodox church

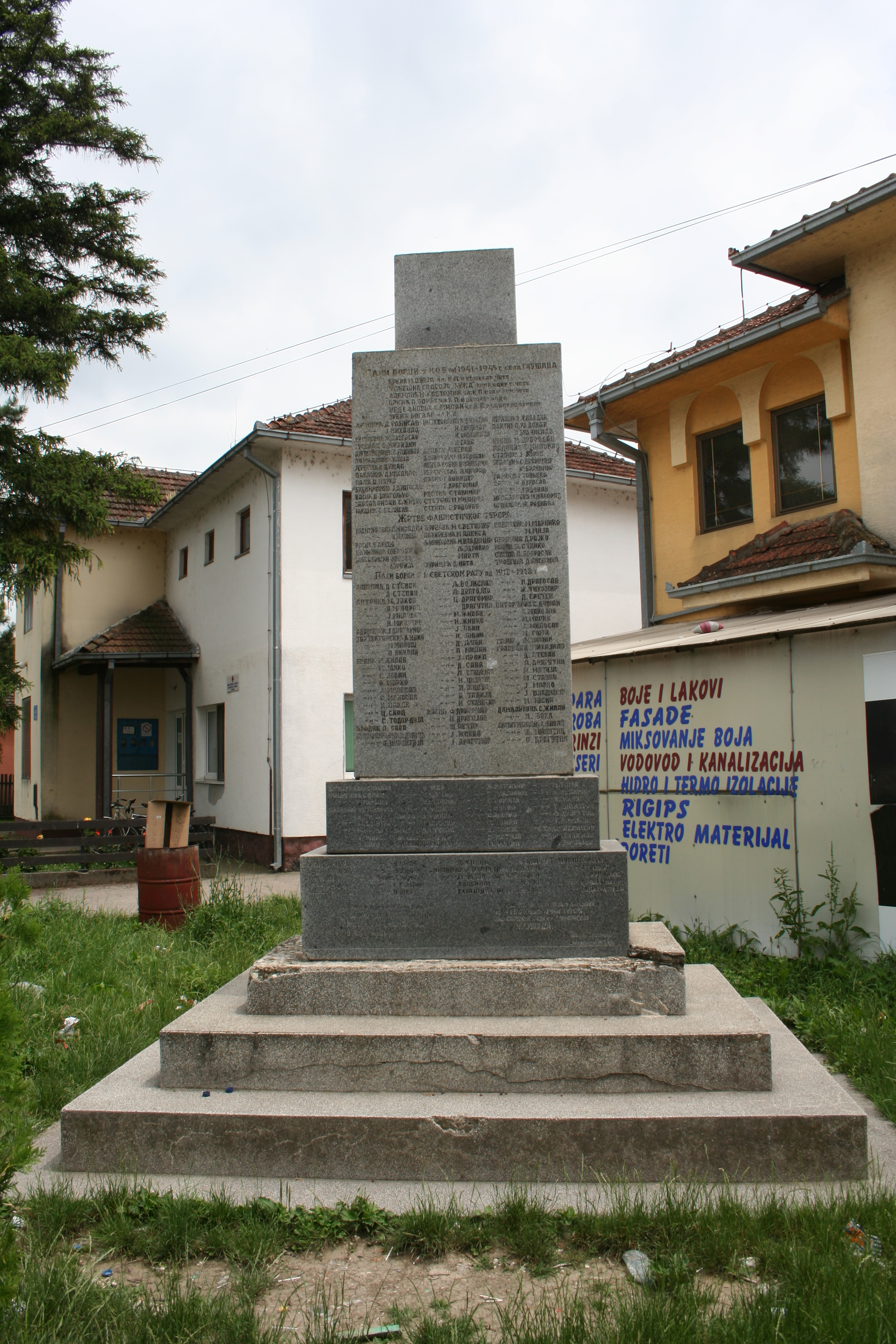
Monument to National Liberation Army and victims of Fascism

== The First World War ==
Glušci was the scene of fierce fighting between the armies of Serbia and Austria-Hungary during the First World War. The latter attempted to seize the whole Mačva territory of northwestern Serbia starting on 1 September 1914. However, the Serbian Army stopped their advance by 7 September, using a diagonal line of multiple trenches running through Glušci and neighboring Uzveće. The invasion ended ten days later with an Austrian foothold in the Mačva with the frontlines unchanged. Casualties ran into the many thousands on both sides.

On 5 November 1914, the Austrians conducted a new offensive and overran the trenches running through Glušci. This initiated the third offensive against Serbia. However, the results of the Battle of Kolubara were decisive for the Serbian Army, causing the Austrians to evacuate all of Serbia, including the Mačva, by the middle of December 1914.

Glušci was totally destroyed and abandoned during the war, and rebuilt only after the peace.

== See also ==
- List of places in Serbia
- Mačva
