= Saint Peter of Cetinje Serbian Orthodox Seminary =

Eastern Orthodox seminary in Cetinje, Montenegro

Coordinates: 42°23′19.6″N 18°55′20.5″E

- Српска православна богословија Светог Петра Цетињског
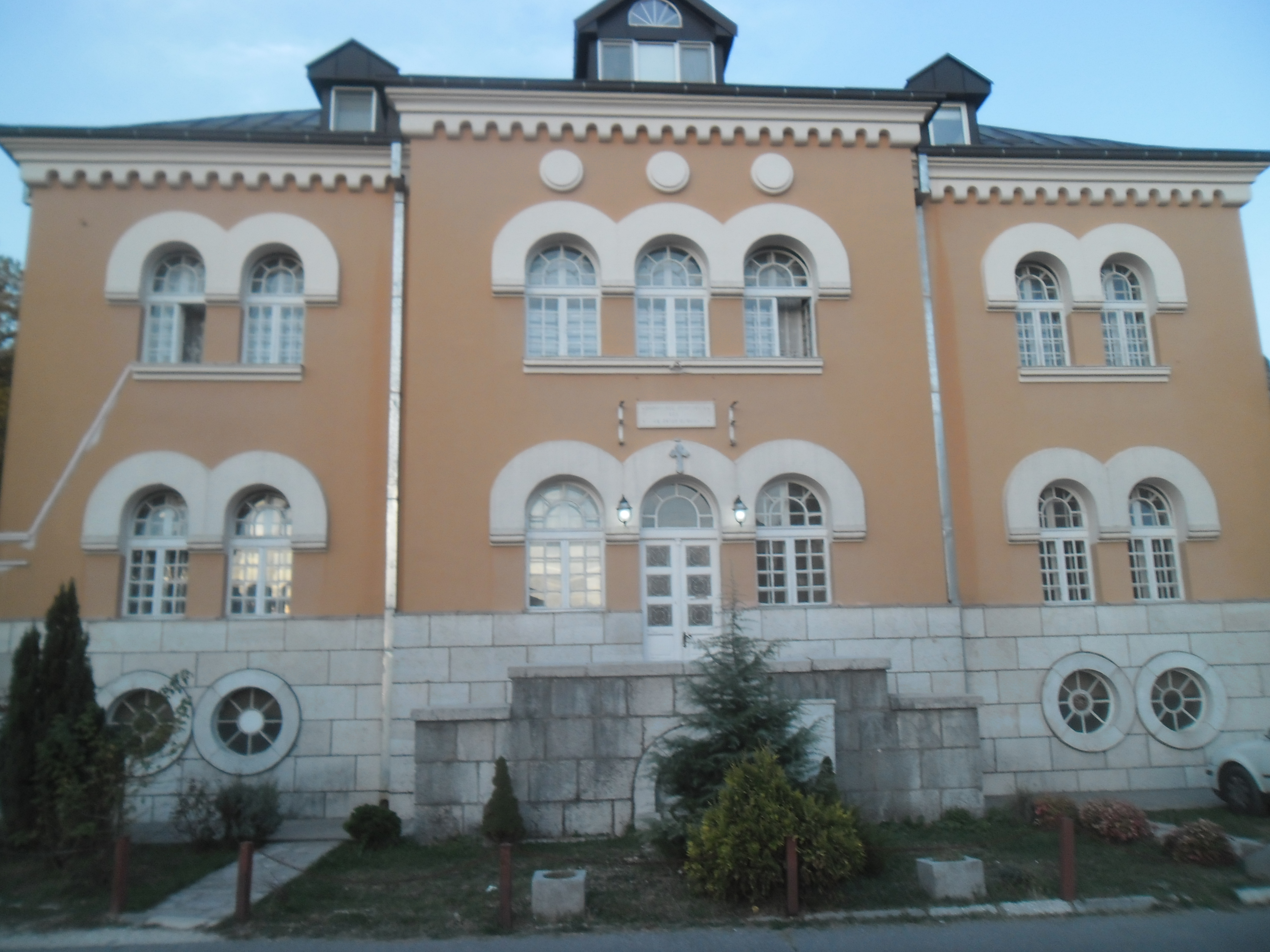
- Medovina bb Cetinje; Montenegro

Information
- Type: Seminary
- Religious affiliation: Eastern Orthodox
- Established: 1863
- Language: Serbian
- Campus: Urban
- Website: Official website

Saint Peter of Cetinje Serbian Orthodox Seminary (Serbian: Српска православна богословија Светог Петра Цетињског, romanized: Srpska pravoslavna bogoslovija Svetog Petra Cetinjskog), also known as the Cetinje Seminary (Serbian: Цетињска богословија, romanized: Cetinjska bogoslovija), is a secondary educational institution of the Serbian Orthodox Church located in Cetinje, Montenegro. A boarding school, it prepares future clergymen for service in the Serbian Orthodox Church.

== History ==
The first school for theologians existed at the Cetinje Monastery during the time of Serbian Metropolitan Petar I Petrović-Njegoš, later canonized as Saint Peter of Cetinje. Metropolitan Petar II Petrović-Njegoš also studied there. The Provisional Seminary of Cetinje was established in 1863 by Archimandrite Nićifor Dučić, with the help of Archimandrite Ilarion Roganović, later Metropolitan of Montenegro and Brda.

This was the first high school in the Principality of Montenegro and could only be enrolled by elementary school students from Cetinje and vicinity. Just a few months later, the seminary stopped working since there were no material means for its functioning.

In 1868, Russian Emperor Alexander II met with Prince Nikola Petrović in Saint Petersburg and agreed that the Russian imperial court would help the functioning of the new seminary with 8,000 rubles annually, as well as the opening of the Girls' Institute next to the seminary with 5,500 rubles. The task of the Girls' Institute was to educate girls, who would later marry theologians.

The curriculum and preparation of first textbooks was assigned to Archpriest Mikhail Rajevski (serving at the Russian Embassy in Vienna) and Master Milan Kostić, who was educated at the Kiev Theological Academy. The Holy Synod of the Russian Orthodox Church then gave confirmation and blessing of the work done so the seminary solemnly began its work in 1869 at Biljarda. Prince Nikola Petrović appointed Milan Kostić to the post of the rector, who was subordinated to Metropolitan of Montenegro and Brda Ilarion Roganović.

In 1873, the seminary was moved to Ostrog Monastery, while in 1875 it suspended its work due to the outbreak of the Herzegovinian Uprising and the forthcoming Montenegrin–Ottoman War.

In 1887, Prince Nikola Petrović approved a new curriculum for the three-year Theological and Teaching School, which was enrolled by distinguished secondary school graduates. The students did not live in the dormitory, and the rectorate of the school was merged with the management of the Cetinje Gymnasium.

In 1916, due to Austro-Hungarian occupation of the Montenegro the Cetinje Seminary stopped operating with its archives being destroyed.

The Cetinje Seminary was the only Serbian Orthodox seminary Serbian Orthodox Church that operated during the World War II.

In the 1992, premises of the Cetinje Seminary were renovated and started functioning later that year.

In 1995, Joanikije Mićović was elected a new rector. In 2002, when he was succeeded by archpriest-staurophore Gojko Perović.

== Courses and curriculum ==
Seminary education lasts five years. Students study Bible (Old Testament, New Testament), Bible history, history of the Christianity, church singing, catechism, apology of faith, Liturgy, patrology, dogmatics, Canon law, pedagogy, homily, history of religion with Sects, History of the Serbian Orthodox Church, philosophy, ethics with Asceticism, and computer science. In addition to Serbian, students also study Russian, Greek, English, and Church Slavonic.

== List of heads ==
Elder of the Provisional Seminary of Cetinje
Image	Name	Start	End
	Nićifor Dučić	1863	1864

Rector of the Cetinje Seminary
Image	Name	Start	End
	Milan Kostić	1869	1872
	Visarion Ljubiša	1872	1875
	Božo Novaković		

Representative of the Seminary and the Teaching School
Image	Name	Start	End
	Ilija Beara		
	Jovo Ljepava		
	Živko Dragović		
	Lazo Popović		
	Pero Vučković		

Rector of the Saint Peter of Cetinje Seminary
Image	Name	Start	End
	Stanko Ivanović	1921	
	Vasilije Ristić		1945
	Momčilo Krivokapić	1992	1995
	Joanikije Mićović	1995	2002
	Gojko Perović	2002	2016

== Alumni ==
- Danilo Dajković, metropolitan of Montenegro and the Littoral
- Simeon Zloković, bishop of Gornji Karlovac
