= Church of the Nativity of the Theotokos, Bogatić =

Church in Mačva District, Serbia

Church of the Nativity of the Theotokos
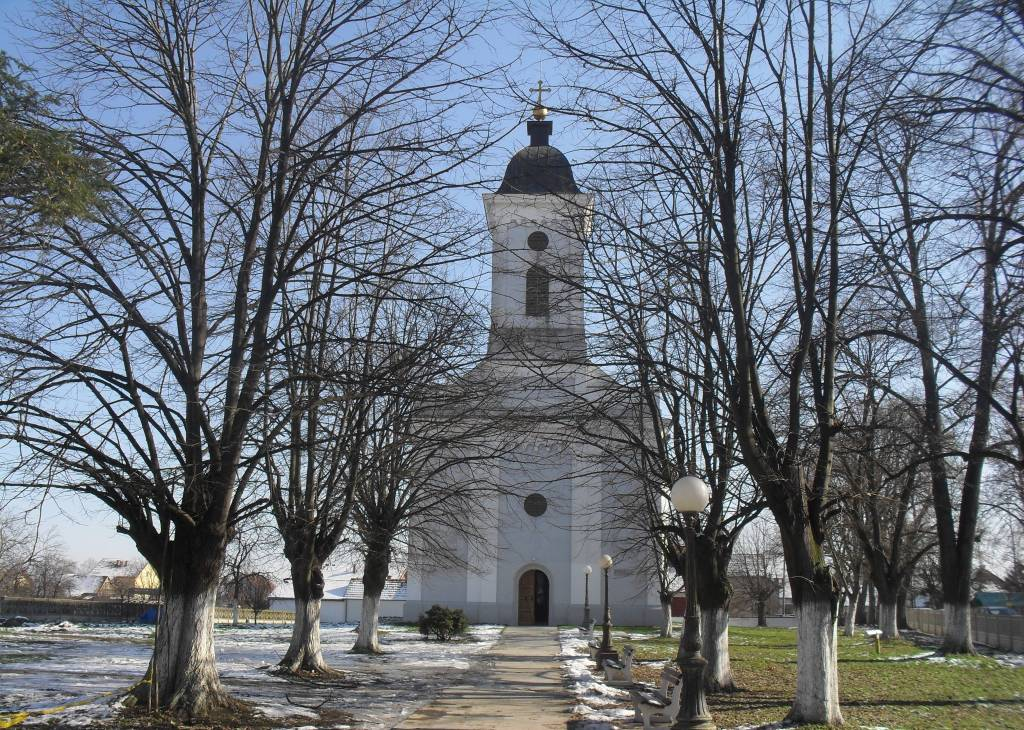

- Location within Serbia

Religion
- Affiliation: Serbian Orthodox Church

Location
- Location: Bogatić, Serbia
- Interactive map of Church of the Nativity of the Theotokos

Architecture
- Completed: 1856

Church of the Nativity of the Theotokos in Bogatić is a Serbian Orthodox Church, built in 1856 on the foundations where an older building once stood.
