= Bogatić =

Bogatić Богатић (Serbian)
- Village and municipality
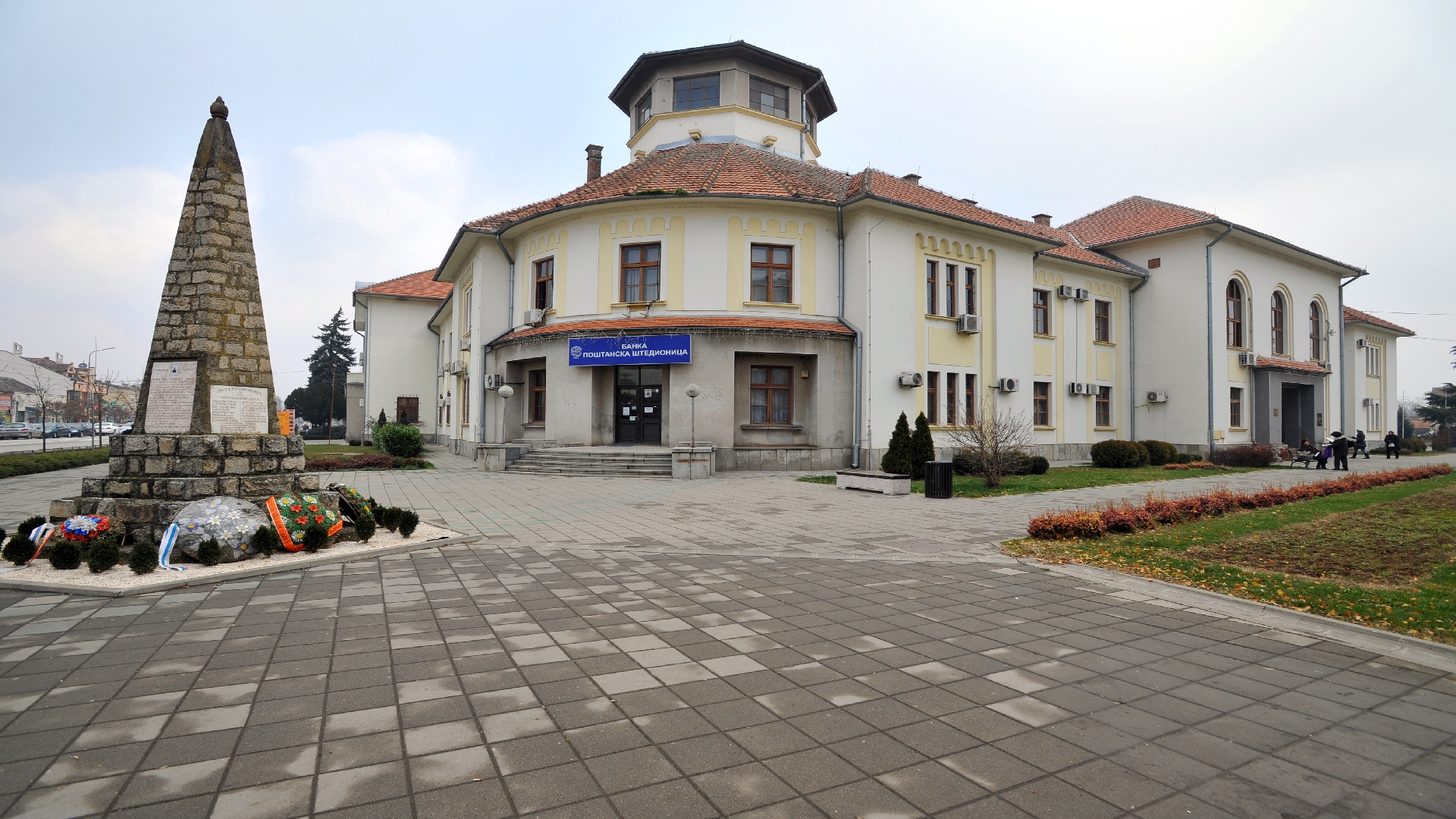
- Bogatić

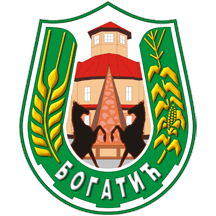
- Coat of arms

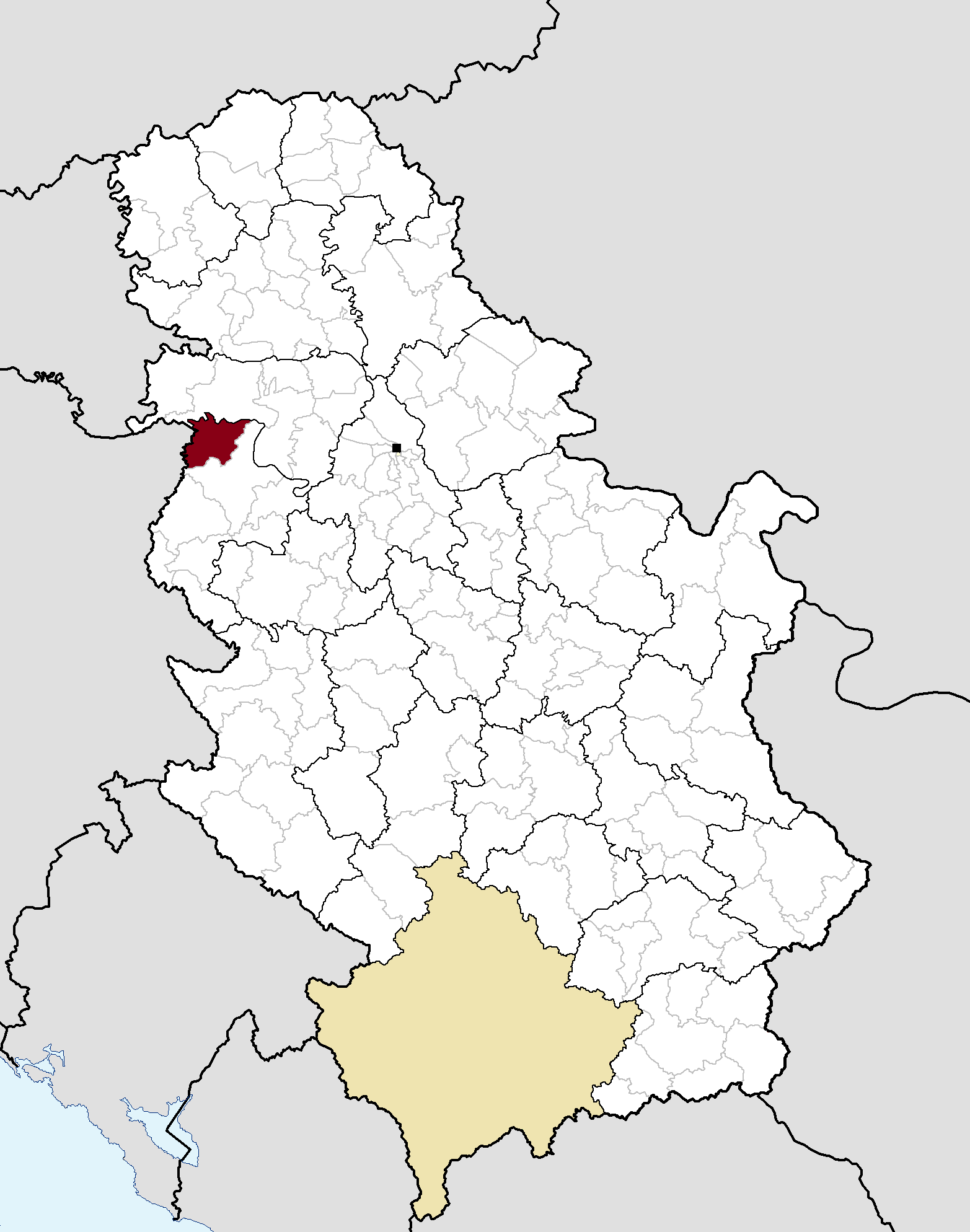
- Location of the town of Bogatić within Serbia
- Coordinates: 44°50′N 19°29′E
- Country: Serbia
- Statistical Region: Šumadija and Western Serbia
- Region: Mačva
- District: Mačva District
- Municipality: Bogatić
- Settlements: 14

Government
  - Mayor: Milan Damnjanović (SNS)

Area
  - Village: 47.82 km^{2} (18.46 sq mi)
  - Municipality: 384 km^{2} (148 sq mi)
- Elevation: 81 m (266 ft)

Population (2022 census)
  - Municipality: 24,522
  - Municipality density: 63.9/km^{2} (165/sq mi)
- Time zone: UTC+1 (CET)
  - Summer (DST): UTC+2 (CEST)
- Postal code: 15350
- Area code: +381(0)15
- Car plates: BĆ
- Website: www.bogatic.rs

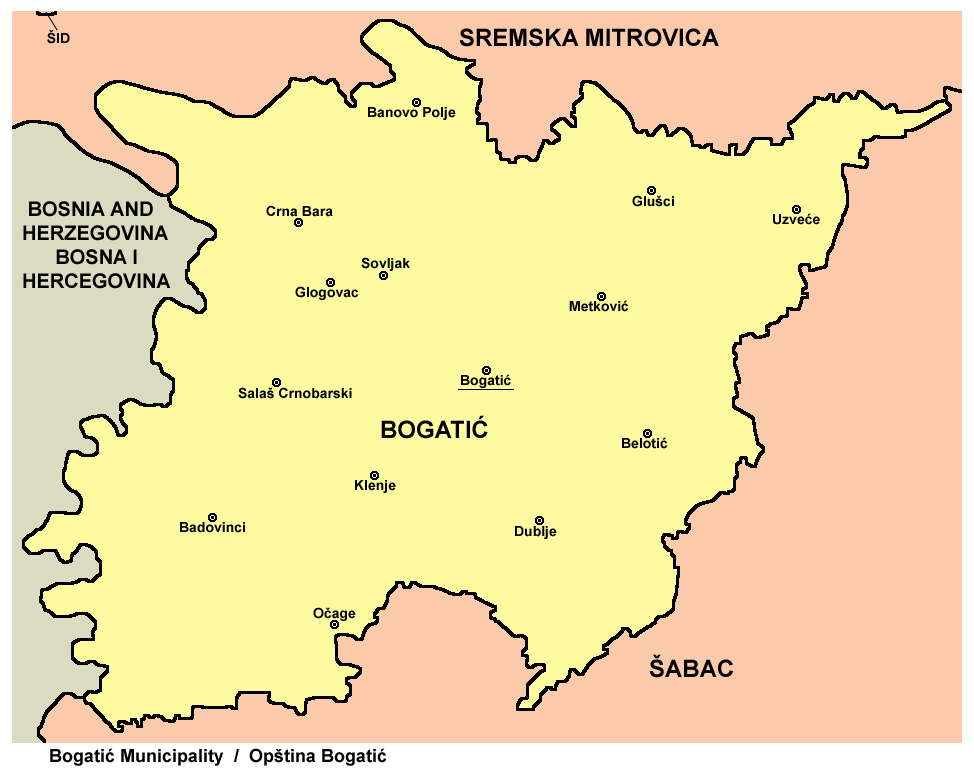
Map of Bogatić municipality

Bogatić (Serbian Cyrillic: Богатић, pronounced [bǒɡatitɕ]) is a town and municipality located in the Mačva District of western Serbia. As of the 2022 census, it has 24,522 residents.

== Geography ==
Bogatić is located in the western part of Serbia. The nearest large settlement is Šabac, Mačva's administrative center, located 24.5 kilometers to the east. Its distance from the capital, Belgrade, is 99.7 kilometers.

Bogatić is located along the northwestern part of the fertile and rich lands in Mačva. Two rivers flow through the town: the Drina from the west and the Sava from the north. Bogatić holds large amounts of groundwater underneath. The population heavily relies on their water supply from underground sources. A river network gravitates towards the town via the Sava, giving it the appearance of a fan with a knot when seen at Šabac. The climate in Bogatić is warm and temperate, classified as Cfb by the Köppen-Geiger system. The average temperature is 11.5 °C and precipitation averages 704 mm annually.

Bogatić is rich in geothermal springs and by the end of 2018, it should become the first town in Serbia which will use geothermal energy for district heating. The hot water (36 to 80 °C (97 to 176 °F)) was discovered in the early 1980s. Geothermal well BB1, one of 8 dug so far, will be used. It has the capacity of 25 L/s (330 imp gal/min) of hot water (75 °C (167 °F)), producing the energy equal to 63 tons of liquid fuel per day. The well is located almost in downtown, only 1.5 km (0.93 mi) from the objects that will be heated, which additionally lowers the cost of the project. For now, the heating system will include pre-schools, elementary schools, high schools, municipal and judicial buildings, communal companies and police. The pipes will be laid in the ringed system, needed to cool the water down to 55 °C (131 °F), but it will also allow for the future addition of other objects to the heating grid. The studies are still being conducted and the industrial complex, polyhouses and newer, energy efficient buildings might be added in the future. The final phase of the construction started on 16 July 2018.

== History ==
The area of Bogatić was inhabited in the early Neolithic, with evidence of finds from the Starčevo culture present throughout the area, dated to around 5000 B.C. Finds from the Vinča culture dated around 3800 B.C. to 3000 B.C. were found in the area as well.

The area was settled by the Scordisci, who were responsible for founding the city of Singidon (present-day Belgrade). During Roman rule, many settlements have been founded in the area, as evidenced by fragments of bricks and roof tiles found dating from that era.

The name of the town, Bogatić, was first mentioned during the Habsburg rule in Serbia from 1718 to 1739, with 44 families living in the town. Among the 75 settlements recorded in the Mačva at that time, Bogatić had the largest population. During the first Serbian uprising, Bogatić was the administrative center in Mačva. In 1818, the census recorded 201 houses in the village.

During the rule of Prince Miloš, administrative reforms were enacted throughout Mačva. An urban road complex and significant urban planning were implemented.

Bogatić suffered significant population decline as a result of the Balkan Wars. In 1914, during World War I, Austro-Hungarian soldiers entered the village, committing massacres against the civilian population. The village and its surroundings were stages of fierce battles. The city was liberated several times during the war. In 1924, it was declared a municipality. The building of the Municipal Hall, which originally served as the building of the Srez Administration, was constructed from 1929 to 1934.

During World War II, the village was occupied by Nazi Germany. In mid-July 1941, a partisan detachment sought to liberate the village and nearby cities and towns was formed. On August 7 of the same year, which was market day, the detachment attacked and occupied the village. Three peasant wagons loaded with weapons and ammunition were sent into the village accompanied by partisans disguised as peasants. When they arrived, the partisans immediately seized the hidden weapons and shocked the local patrol, who surrendered without resistance. Bogatić was soon liberated and all political prisoners were released from prison. Immediately after the liberation, an assembly was held in the town center wherein the detachment commander spoke. After the assembly, many villagers volunteered as partisans.

The liberation constituted a major political success for the partisans, as news of the liberation emboldened the partisans in Mačva and in occupied Serbia, and it made the village one of the centers of the revolution. A monument was erected downtown, signifying the liberation of the town from Nazi control and in honor of the partisans who participated in the liberation.

== Demographics ==
Historical population
Year	Pop.	±% p.a.
1948	35,560	—
1953	37,492	+1.06%
1961	37,141	−0.12%
1971	35,882	−0.34%
1981	35,256	−0.18%
1991	34,438	−0.23%
2002	32,990	−0.39%
2011	28,843	−1.48%
2022	24,522	−1.46%

According to the 2011 census, the municipality had a population of 28,843 inhabitants.

Within the town, 5,910 adults were recorded. The average age among residents is 40.0 years (38.6 for men and 41.4 for women). The town has 2,289 households and average number of members per household is 3.21.

=== Ethnic groups ===
The ethnic composition of the municipality:

Ethnic group	Population	%
Serbs	27,517	95.40%
Romani	514	1.78%
Croats	33	0.11%
Yugoslavs	27	0.09%
Muslims	18	0.06%
Macedonians	11	0.04%
Ukrainians	11	0.04%
Others	712	2.47%
Total	28,843	

== Economy ==
The following table gives a preview of total number of registered people employed in legal entities per their core activity (as of 2018):

Activity	Total
Agriculture, forestry and fishing	29
Mining and quarrying	24
Manufacturing	490
Electricity, gas, steam and air conditioning supply	31
Water supply; sewerage, waste management and remediation activities	38
Construction	119
Wholesale and retail trade, repair of motor vehicles and motorcycles	826
Transportation and storage	126
Accommodation and food services	137
Information and communication	43
Financial and insurance activities	34
Real estate activities	5
Professional, scientific and technical activities	159
Administrative and support service activities	36
Public administration and defense; compulsory social security	345
Education	332
Human health and social work activities	261
Arts, entertainment and recreation	47
Other service activities	68
Individual agricultural workers	2,427
Total	5,581

== Tourism ==
There are three churches in and around Bogatić which are declared cultural monuments. The Church of the Nativity of the Virgin is one of the oldest in the region and is considered, in terms of architecture, as one of the most beautiful. There is also a Church of the Holly Apostles Peter and Paul in the village of Glogovac and Church of the Feast of the Ascension in the village of Dublje. There is also the Ivanje monastery, dedicated to the prophet Elijah, which also serves as the sanatorium for people battling the addictions. The monastery was built in 1983. Bogatić has hot thermal springs, with the water being heated up to 70 °C (158 °F). It is used for the thermal spa center "Termalna rivijera", though the water is being first cooled down.

The surrounding area is known for the village tourism. An area along the bank of the Drina in the village of Crna Bara, named "Vasin Šib", was developed into the weekend-settlement. It has a hotel, motel, several restaurants and bungalows. Several sports fields are also built.

In the village of Sovljak, there is an ethno-park "Sovljak" in the typical architectural style of the area. The houses were built in the 1920s and the entire yard, sort of an outdoor museum, covers 2 ha (4.9 acres). There is a lime tree in the yard, planted in the 1910s. One of the attractions in the village is an old style village house called osećanka, built in the late 19th century. The central room in the house is turned into a museum, and it makes one unit with the surrounding vajat (wooden summer house), barn, pergola and the outdoor masonry oven. The house used to have a sundial. Today, the village hosts a local exhibition of naïve art. The village is also the setting of the August festivities of "Hajduk evenings" with the traditional ceremony of the "Mačva wedding" and the competition for the Harambaša. In the village of Glušci, there is another ethno-park, "Avlija".

== See also ==
- List of places in Serbia
