= Neofit, Bishop of Zeta =

Church leader

Neofit Неофит
- Bishop of Zeta
- Church: Serbian Orthodox Church
- Diocese: Eparchy of Zeta (1219–1346)
- See: Monastery of Holy Archangel Michael, Prevlaka, Montenegro
- Appointed: 1250
- Installed: 1250
- Term ended: 1270
- Predecessor: German I
- Successor: Jevstatije I

Personal details
- Born: Unknown
- Died: Unknown, presumably c. 1270
- Denomination: Serbian Orthodox

Neofit (Anglicized: Neophyte; fl. 1269; Serbian: Неофит; r. 1250–1270) was the third bishop of Zeta. He succeeded German I, the second bishop of the Eparchy of Zeta, and preceded Jevstatije I, the hegumen of Hilandar and the future archbishop of Serbia.

== Biography ==
=== Background ===
Under the Nemanjić dynasty, Serbia was in a period of consolidation and expansion. King Stefan Uroš I (1243–1276) worked on strengthening the central authority and expanded Serbian territories while fostering cultural and religious development, including the construction of monasteries and churches. During this time, the Eparchy of Zeta was part of the Serbian Orthodox Church, established by Saint Sava in 1219, who was the first archbishop of Serbia, and he also appointed the first bishop of Zeta, Ilarion. It's important to note that Zeta was a crown land of the Serbian state under the Nemanjić Dynasty.

=== Reign ===
Unfortunately, the details of Neofit's life are extremely scarce and unknown. He was appointed a bishop of Zeta in 1250, but Miodrag Purković was of the opinion that Neofit "was a bishop at least ten years earlier, that is, around 1253, if not even earlier," because Jevstatije I, as Vasilije Marković believes, was ordained around 1250.

Neofit was mentioned in the Iliovac nomocanon (krmčija), which was written by a certain Bogdan for the church of St. Michael in Ilovica (or Prevlaka). Neofit also built the church of St. Peter in Bogdašići in Boka Kotorska in 1269, as said on one of the two preserved inscriptions in the church, the other one being in Latin. In the catalogs, he was mentioned in the years 1250, 1261, 1262, 1269, and 1270. He is also mentioned in a record between September 1, 1261, and August 31, 1262, which documents the creation of the church.

It is first mentioned in a record between September 1, 1261 and August 31, 1262, when [Bogdan] copied the nomocanon for him. Iliovac nomocanon, a manuscript that was written by a certain Bogdan for the church of St. Archangel in the town of Ilovica on the orders of the Zeta bishop Neofit in 1262. That church is certainly the monastery of St. Archangel on Prevlaka (Tumba), on the eastern coast of the Tivat Bay in Boka, because this monastery was the seat of the Zeta diocese in the 13th century. — Sava Vuković (bishop), on Srpski jerarsi od devetog do dvadesetog veka.

His episcopal seat was assumed to be located in the Monastery of Holy Archangel Michael (near modern-day Tivat, in Prevlaka), which was a standard seat at the time for the Eparchy of Zeta. He also supposedly ordained Jevstatije I, the future sixth archbishop of Serbia, to be the bishop of Zeta. He might have died in the same year when his term ended, which was in 1270.
