= German I, Bishop of Zeta =

German Герман
- Bishop of Zeta
- Church: Serbian Orthodox Church
- Diocese: Eparchy of Zeta (1219–1346)
- See: Monastery of Holy Archangel Michael, Prevlaka, Montenegro
- Appointed: 1242
- Installed: 1250
- Term ended: 1250
- Predecessor: Ilarion
- Successor: Neofit

Personal details
- Born: Unknown
- Died: Unknown, presumably c. 1250
- Denomination: Serbian Orthodox

German I (Anglicized: Germanus; fl. 1269; Serbian: Герман; r. 1242–1250) was the second bishop of Zeta. He succeeded Ilarion, the first bishop of the Eparchy of Zeta, the hegumen of Hilandar and a disciple of Saint Sava, and preceded Neofit, the third bishop of the Eparchy of Zeta.

== Biography ==
During the Nemanjić dynasty, Serbia experienced growth and unification. King Stefan Uroš I (1243–1276) focused on strengthening the central government and expanding Serbian lands while promoting cultural and religious progress, which included building monasteries and churches. At this time, the Eparchy of Zeta was part of the Serbian Orthodox Church, founded by Saint Sava in 1219, who was the first archbishop of Serbia and appointed Ilarion as the first bishop of Zeta. It is also significant that Zeta was a royal territory of the Serbian state during the Nemanjić Dynasty.

The details of German's life are barely known. He succeeded Ilarion and preceded Neofit. One of the only details that exist about German's reign is that both Ilarion and German shared the same diocese, the Eparchy of Zeta, and see, which is the Monastery of Holy Archangel Michael in Prevlaka, Montenegro; the see of all nine bishops of Zeta from the years 1219 to 1346 was in this monastery. German was also mentioned in the Monastery of the Holy Trinity of Pljevlja without a year as second in row.
