= Saint Sava =

Eastern Orthodox bishop and saint

Saint Sava The Illuminator
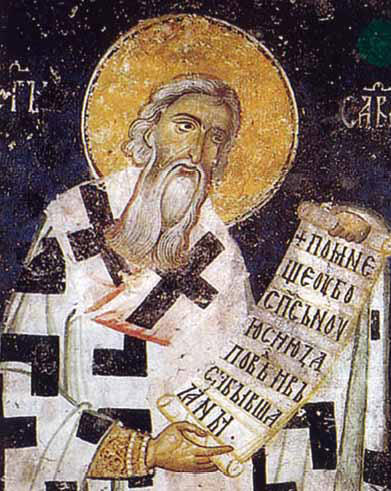
- Fresco depicting Saint Sava at the Patriarchate of Peć Monastery, Serbia

Equal to the Apostles Apostle of the Serbs Patron of Serbia Venerable Hieroconfessor Church Father Athonite Father Pillar of Orthodoxy
- Born: Rastko Nemanjić; 1169 or 1174; Miščiće, Grand Principality of Serbia
- Died: 14 January 1235; Tarnovo, Bulgarian Empire
- Venerated in: Eastern Orthodox Church; Catholic Church
- Major shrine: Church of Saint Sava, Belgrade
- Feast: January 27 [O.S. January 14]
- Attributes: Ktetor, teacher, theologian, legislator, diplomat, writer
- Patronage: Serbia, Serbs, Serbian schools, Serbian medicine

Prince of Hum
- Reign: 12th century
- Predecessor: Miroslav
- Successor: Miroslav
- Dynasty: Nemanjić
- Father: Stefan Nemanja
- Archbishop of Serbia
- Church: Serbian Archbishopric
- See: Žiča
- Installed: 1219
- Term ended: 1233
- Successor: Arsenije
- Other post: Archimandrite

Orders
- Ordination: Patriarch Manuel I of Constantinople

Personal details
- Buried: Holy Forty Martyrs Church (until May 6, 1237); Mileševa (until 1594)
- Denomination: Eastern Orthodoxy
- Parents: Stefan Nemanja and Ana
- Occupation: archbishop

Saint Sava (Serbian Cyrillic: Свети Сава, romanized: Sveti Sava, Serbian pronunciation: [sʋɛ̂ːtiː sǎːʋa]; 1169 or 1174 – 14 January 1235), known as the Enlightener or the Illuminator, was a Serbian prince and Eastern Orthodox monk who became the first Archbishop of the autocephalous Serbian Church. He was also a writer, diplomat, and the founder of Serbian law.

Sava, born as Rastko Nemanjić (Serbian Cyrillic: Растко Немањић), was the youngest son of Serbian Grand Prince Stefan Nemanja (founder of the Nemanjić dynasty), and ruled the appanage of Zachlumia briefly in 1190–92. He then left for Mount Athos, where he became a monk and took the monastic name Sava (Sabbas). At Athos he established the monastery of Hilandar, which became one of the most important cultural and religious centres of the Serbian people. In 1219, the Patriarchate exiled in Nicea recognized him as the first Serbian Archbishop, and in the same year, he authored the oldest known constitution of Serbia, the Zakonopravilo nomocanon, thus securing full religious and political independence. Sava is regarded as the greatest figure of Serbian medieval literature and author of the first Serbian "biography". Specifically, he wrote the life of his father, the Serbian ruler Stefan Nemanja.

He is widely considered one of the most important figures in Serbian history. Saint Sava is venerated by the Eastern Orthodox Church on January 27 [O.S. January 14]. Many artistic works from the Middle Ages to modern times have interpreted his life. He is the patron saint of Serbia, Serbs, Serbian education, and medicine. The Church of Saint Sava in Belgrade is dedicated to him, built on the site where the Ottomans burnt his relics in 1594, during an uprising in which Serbs used icons of Sava as their war flags; the church is one of the largest church buildings in the world.

To distinguish him from other saints and canonized Serbian archbishops of the same name, he is also posthumously titled Saint Sava I of Serbia.

== Biography ==
=== Early life ===
Rastko Nemanjić (Serbian Cyrillic: Растко Немањић, Serbian pronunciation: [râstkɔ nɛ̌maɲitɕ]), a diminutive of Rastislav, was born in 1169 or 1174, in the village of Miščiće, in Deževa Valley, in the modern-day administrative area of the City of Novi Pazar. As the youngest son of Grand Prince Stefan Nemanja and his wife Ana, Prince Rastko belonged to the first generation of the Nemanjić dynasty, alongside his brothers Vukan and Stefan. His biographers mention that he was born after a hiatus in the couple's childbearing and was therefore especially dear. At the Serbian court the brothers received a good education in the Byzantine tradition, which exercised great political, cultural and religious influence in Serbia.

He grew up in a time of great foreign relations activities in Serbia. Rastko showed himself serious and ascetic; as the youngest son, he was made Prince of Hum at an early age, in c. 1190. Hum was a province between Neretva and Dubrovnik (Ragusa). Having his own court with magnates (velmože), senior officials and selected local nobility, the governance in Hum was not only an honorary title but constituted a practical school of state administration. Teodosije the Hilandarian said that Rastko, as a ruler, was "mild and gentle, kind to everyone, loving the poor as few others, and very respecting of the monastic life". He showed no interest in fame, wealth, or the throne.

The governance of Hum had previously been held by his uncle Miroslav, who continued to hold at least the Lim region with Bijelo Polje while Rastko held Hum. After two years, in autumn 1192 or shortly afterwards, Rastko left Hum for Mount Athos. Miroslav may have continued as ruler of Hum after Rastko had left. Athonite monks were frequent visitors to the Serbian court – lectures perhaps made him determined to leave.

=== Mount Athos ===
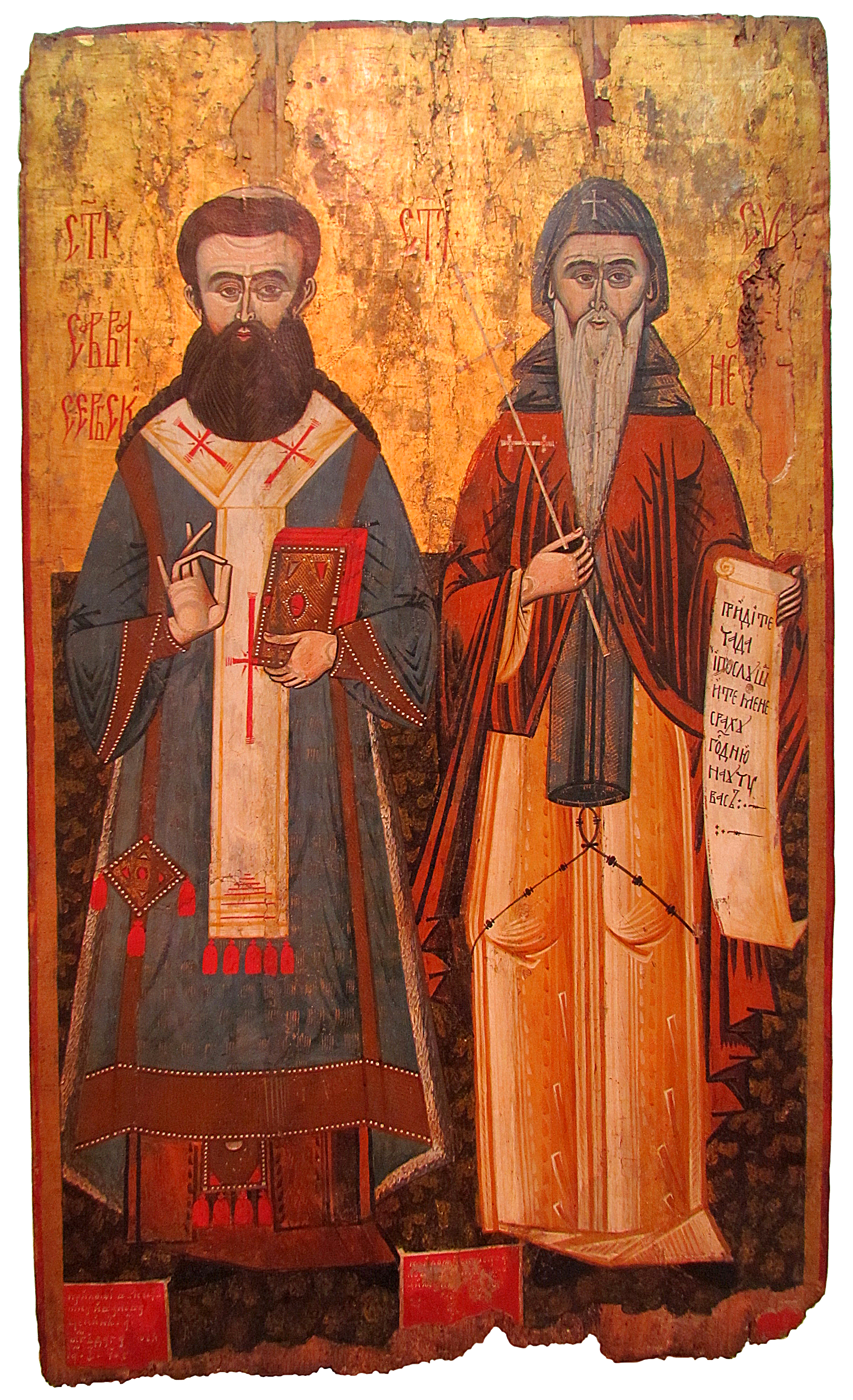
18th-century icon of Saint Sava and his father Saint Simeon

Upon arriving at Athos, Rastko entered the Russian St. Panteleimon Monastery where he received the monastic name of Sava (Sabbas). According to tradition, a Russian monk was his spiritual guide or mentor and was said to have had earlier visited the Serbian court with other Athonite monks. Sava then entered the Greek Vatopedi monastery, where he would stay for the next seven years, and became more closely acquainted with Greek theological and church-administrational literature. His father tried to persuade him to return to Serbia, but Sava was determined and replied, "You have accomplished all that a Christian sovereign should do; come now and join me in the true Christian life". His young years at Athos had a significant influence on the formation of his personality, it was also here that he found models on which he would organize monastic and church life in Serbia.

Stefan Nemanja took his son's advice – he summoned an assembly at Studenica and abdicated on 25 March 1196, giving the throne to his middle son, Stefan. The next day, Nemanja and his wife Ana took monastic vows. Nemanja took the monastic name Simeon and stayed in Studenica until leaving for Mount Athos in autumn 1197. The arrival was greatly pleasing to Sava and the Athonite community, as Nemanja as a ruler had donated much to the community. The two, with consent of the hegumen (abbot) Theostyriktos of Vatopedi, went on a tour of Athos in late autumn 1197 in order for Simeon to familiarize with all of its churches and sacred places; Nemanja and Ana donated to numerous monasteries, especially Karyes, Iviron and the Great Lavra.

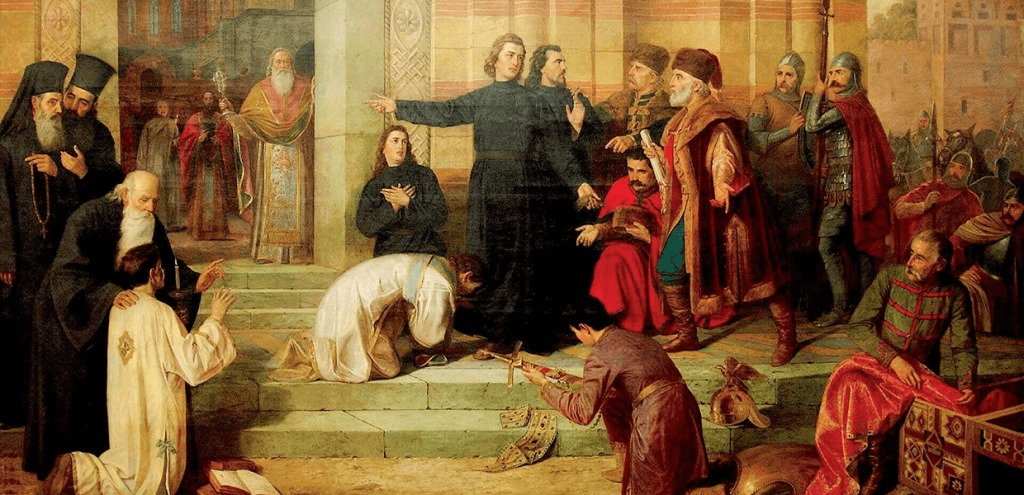
A fresco of Saint Sava, renouncing a return to his royal home, 1907, Stevan Todorović

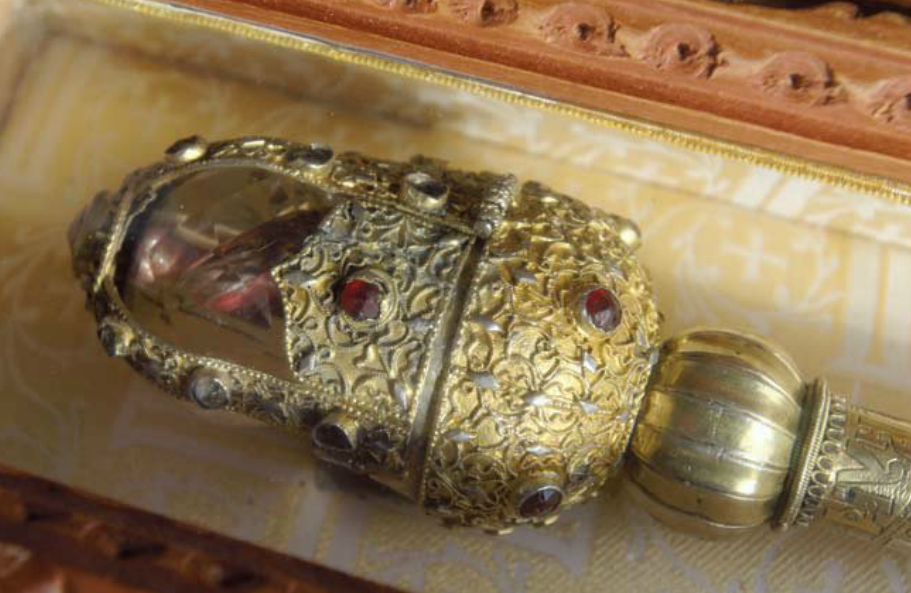
The Scepter of Saint Sava

When Sava visited the Byzantine Emperor Alexios III Angelos at Constantinople, he mentioned the neglected and abandoned Hilandar, and asked the Emperor to grant him and his father permission to restore the monastery and transfer it to Vatopedi. The Emperor approved, and sent a special letter and considerable gold to his friend Stefan Nemanja (monk Simeon). Sava then addressed the protos of Athos, asking them to support the effort so the monastery of Hilandar might become a haven for Serb monks.

All Athonite monasteries, except Vatopedi, accepted the proposal. In July 1198, Emperor Alexios III issued a charter which revoked the earlier decision, and instead not only granted Hilandar, but also the other abandoned monasteries in Mileis, to Simeon and Sava, to be a haven and shelter for Serb monks in Athos. The restoration of Hilandar quickly began and Grand Prince Stefan sent money and other necessities, and issued the founding charter for Hilandar in 1199.

Sava wrote a typikon (liturgical office order) for Hilandar, modeled on the typikon of the monastery of Theotokos Euergetis in Constantinople. Besides Hilandar, Sava was the ktetor of the hermitage at Karyes (seat of Athos) for the monks who devoted themselves to solitude and prayer. In 1199, he authored the typikon of Karyes. Along with the hermitage, he built the chapel dedicated to Sabbas the Sanctified, whose name he received upon monastic vows. His father died on 13 February 1199. In 1204, after 13 April, Sava received the rank of archimandrite.

As Nemanja had earlier (1196) decided to give the rule to Stefan, and not the eldest son, Vukan, the latter began plotting against Stefan in the meantime. He found an ally in Hungarian king Emeric with whom he banished Stefan to Bulgaria, and Vukan seized the Serbian throne (1202). Stefan returned to Serbia with an army in 1204 and pushed Vukan to Zeta, his hereditary land. After problems at Athos with Latin bishops and Boniface of Montferrat following the Fourth Crusade, Sava returned to Serbia in the winter of 1205–1206 or 1206–1207, with the remains of his father which he relocated to his father's endowment, the Studenica monastery, and then reconciled his quarreling brothers. Sava saved the country from further political crisis by ending the dynastic fight, and also completed the canonization process of Nemanja (Simeon) as a saint.

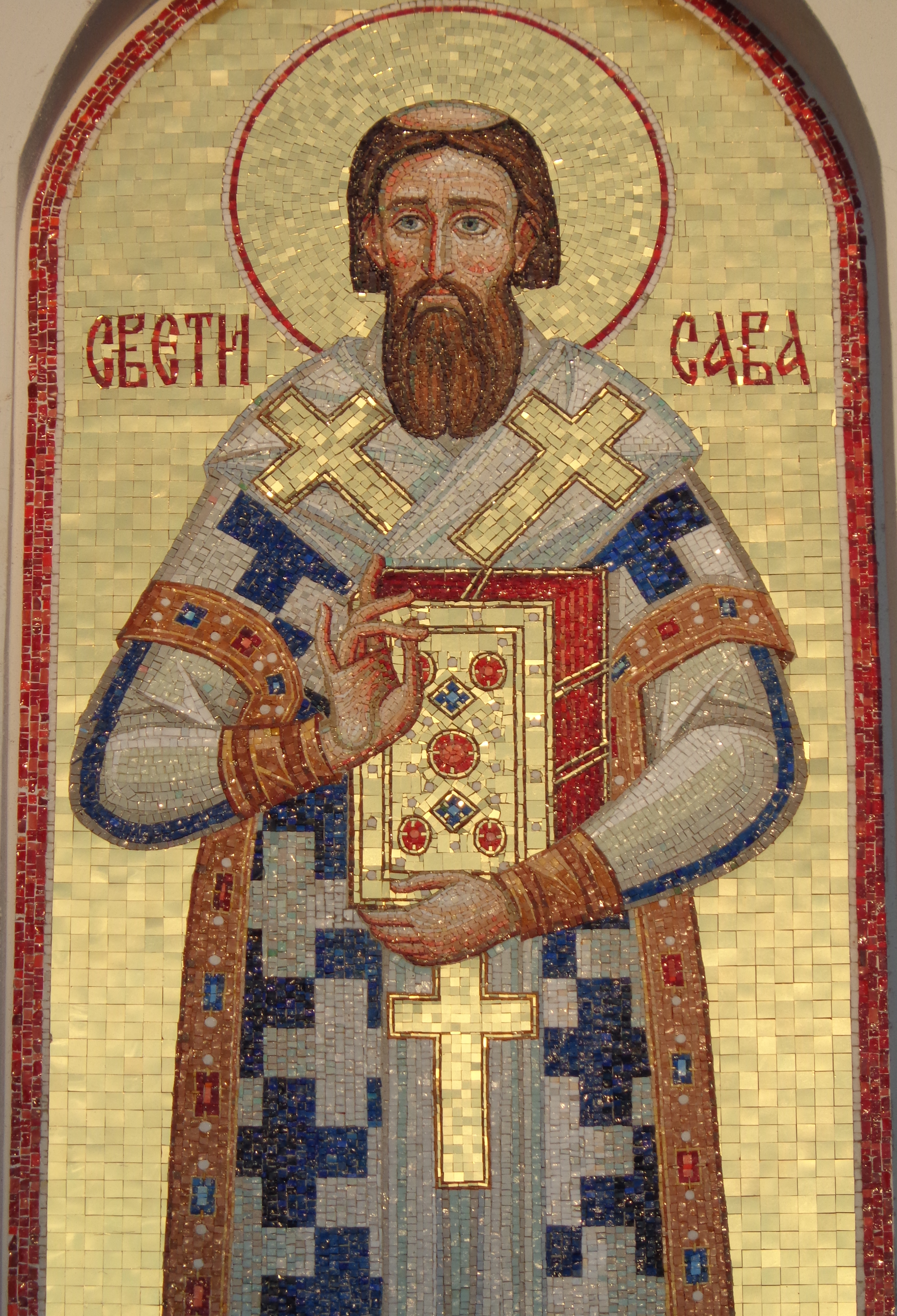
Mosaic of St. Sava on the western wall, outside, of the Church of the Saint Simeon in Novi Beograd

=== Enlightenment ===
Having spent 14 years in Mount Athos, Sava had extensive theological knowledge and spiritual power. According to Sava's biography, he was asked to teach the court and people of Serbia the Christian laws and traditions and "in that way enwisen and educate". Sava then worked on the religious and cultural enlightenment of the Serbian people, educating in Christian morality, love and mercy, meanwhile also working on the church organization. Since his return in 1206, he became the hegumen of Studenica, and as its elder, self-willed entered regulations on the independent status of that monastery in the Studenica Typikon. He used the general chaos in which the Byzantine Empire found itself after the siege of Constantinople (1204) into the hands of the Crusaders, and the strained relations between the Despotate of Epirus (where the Archbishopric of Ohrid was seated, which the Serbian Church was subordinated to) and the Ecumenical Patriarchate of Constantinople in Nicaea, into his advantage. The Studenica Typikon became a sort of lex specialis, which allowed Studenica to have independent status ("Here, therefore, no one is to have authority, neither bishop nor any one else") in relation to the Bishopric of Raška and Archbishopric of Ohrid. The canonization of Nemanja and the Studenica Typikon would be the first steps towards the future autocephaly of the Serbian Church and elevation of the Serbian ruler to king ten years later.

In 1217, archimandrite Sava left Studenica and returned to Mount Athos. His departure has been interpreted by a part of the historians as a reaction to his brother Stefan accepting the royal crown from Rome. Stefan had just prior to this made a large switch in politics, marrying a Venetian noblewoman, and subsequently asked the Pope for a royal crown and political support. With the establishment of the Latin Empire (1204), Rome had considerably increased its power in the Balkans. Stefan was crowned by a papal legate, becoming equal to the other kings, and was called "the First-Crowned King" of Serbia.

Stefan's politics that led to the events of 1217 were somewhat in odds with the Serbian Orthodox tradition, represented by his brother, archimandrite Sava, who favored Eastern Orthodoxy and Byzantine ecclesiastical culture in Serbia. Though Sava left Serbia while talks were underway between Stefan and Rome (apparently due to disagreeing with Stefan's excessive reliance on Rome), he and his brother resumed their good relation after receiving the crown. It is possible that Sava did not agree with everything in his brother's international politics, however, his departure for Athos may also be interpreted as a preparation for obtaining the autocephaly (independence) of the Serbian Archbishopric. His departure was planned, both Domentijan and Teodosije, Sava's biographers, stated that before leaving Studenica he appointed a new hegumen and "put the monastery in good, correct order, and enacted the new church constitution and monastic life order, to be held that way", after which he left Serbia.

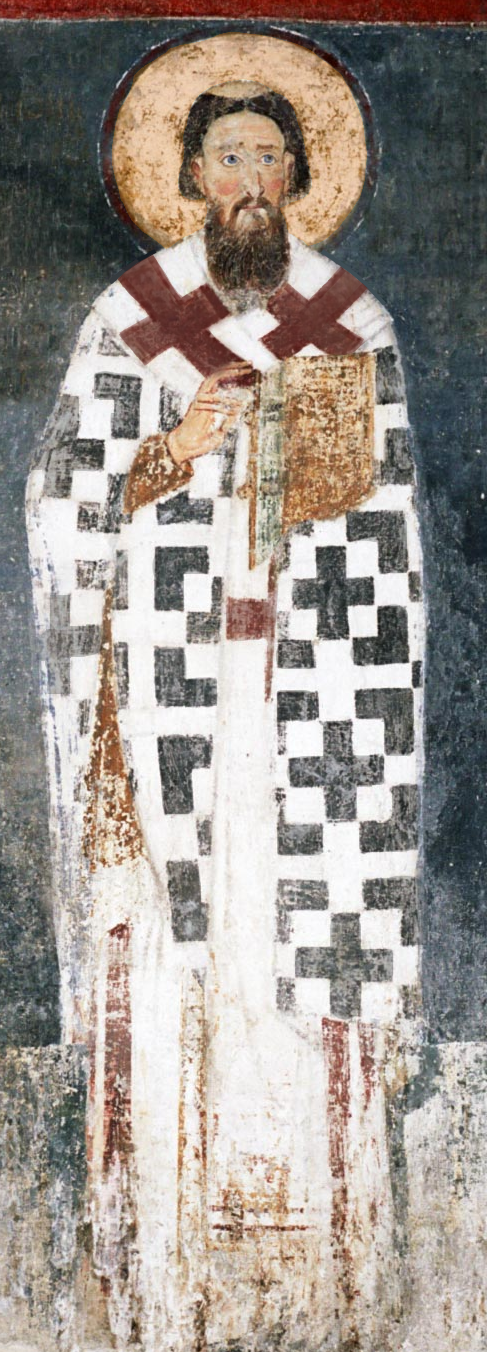
Fresco in Mileševa Monastery

=== Autocephaly and church organization ===
Sava reconciling his quarreling brothers, Paja Jovanović (1901)

The elevation of Serbia into a kingdom did not fully mark the independence of the country, according to that time's understanding, unless the same was achieved with its church. Rulers of such countries, with church bodies subordinated to Constantinople, were viewed as "rulers of lower status who stand under the top chief of the Orthodox Christian world – the Byzantine Emperor". Conditions in Serbia for autocephaly were largely met at the time, with a notable number of learned monks, regulated monastic life, and a stable church hierarchy, thus "its autocephaly, in a way, was only a question of time". It was important to Sava that the head of the Serbian Church was appointed by Constantinople, and not Rome.

On 15 August 1219, during the feast of the Dormition of the Mother of God, Sava was consecrated by Patriarch Manuel I of Constantinople in Nicaea as the first Archbishop of the autocephalous Serbian Church. The patriarch of Constantinople and his Synod thus appointed Sava as the first archbishop of "Serbian and coastal lands." With the support of Emperor Theodore I Laskaris and "the Most Venerable Patriarch and the whole Constantinopolitan assembly" he received the blessing that Serbian archbishops receive consecration from their own bishops' assemblies without seeking consent from the Latin Patriarch of Constantinople. Sava had thus secured the independence of the Church; in the Middle Ages, the Church was the supporter and important factor in state sovereignty, and political and national identity. At the same time, both Laskaris and Manuel were delighted that Serbian policy was continuously looking towards Constantine the Great's legacy – Byzantium – rather than Rome.

From Nicaea, Archbishop Sava returned to Mount Athos, where he profusely donated to the monasteries. In Hilandar, he addressed the question of administration: "he taught the hegumen especially how to, in every virtue, show himself as an example to others; and the brothers, once again, he taught how to listen to everything the hegumen said with the fear of God", as witnessed by Teodosije. From Hilandar, Sava traveled to Thessaloniki, to the monastery of Philokalos, where he stayed for some time as a guest of the Metropolitan of Thessaloniki, Constantine the Mesopotamian, with whom he was a great friend ever since his youth. His stay was of great benefit as he transcribed many works on law needed for his church.

Upon his return to Serbia, he was engaged in the organization of the Serbian Church, especially regarding the structure of bishoprics, those that were situated on locales at the sensitive border with the Catholic West. At the assembly in Žiča in 1219, Sava "chose, from his pupils, God-understanding and God-fearing and honorable men, who were able in managing by divine laws and by the tradition of the Holy Apostles, and keep the apparitions of the holy God-bearing fathers. And he consecrated them and made them bishops" (Domentijan). Sava gave the newly appointed bishops law books and sent them to bishoprics in all parts of Serbia. It is unclear how many bishoprics he founded. The following bishoprics were under his administration: Zeta (Zetska), seated at Monastery of Holy Archangel Michael in Prevlaka near Kotor; Hum (Humska), seated at Monastery of the Holy Mother of God in Ston; Dabar, seated at Monastery of St. Nicholas on the Lim; Moravica, seated at Monastery of St. Achillius in the Moravica region; Budimlja, seated at Monastery of St. George; Toplica, seated at Monastery of St. Nicholas in the Toplica region; Hvosno, seated at Monastery of the Holy Mother of God in the Hvosno region; Žiča, seated at Žiča, the seat of the Church; Raška, seated at Monastery of Holy Apostles Peter and Paul in Peć; Lipljan, seated at Lipljan; Prizren, seated at Prizren. Among his bishops were Ilarion and Metodije. In the same year Sava published the Zakonopravilo (or "St. Sava's Nomocanon"), the first constitution of Serbia; thus the Serbs acquired both forms of independence: political and religious.

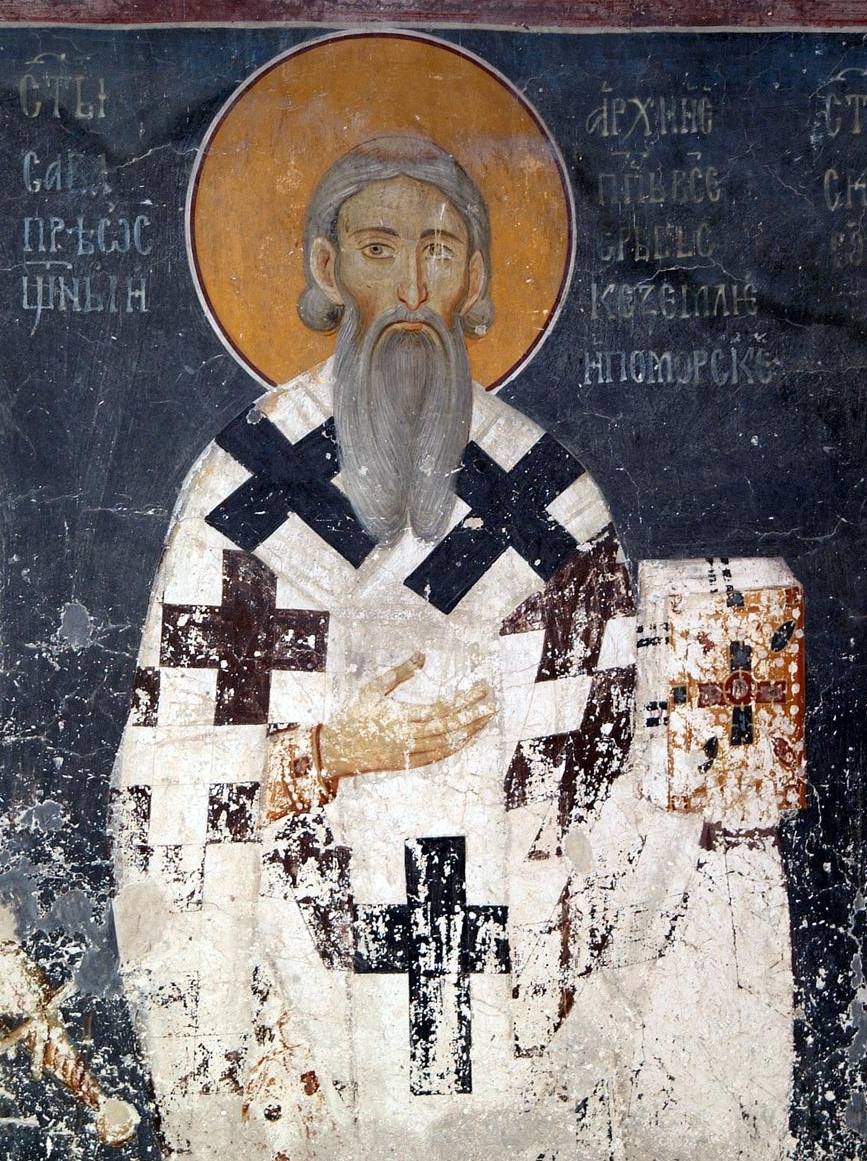
Fresco detail of Saint Sava in Studenica Monastery

The organizational work of Sava was very energetic, and above all, the new organization was given a clear national character. The Greek bishop at Prizren was replaced by a Serb, his disciple. This was not the only feature of his fighting spirit. The determination of the seats of the newly established bishoprics was also performed with especially state-religious intention. The Archbishopric was seated in the Monastery of Žiča, the new endowment of King Stefan. The bishopric in Dabar on the Lim river was situated towards the border with Bosnia, to act on the Orthodox element there and suppress the Bogomil teaching. The bishopric of Zeta was located on the Prevlaka peninsula, Bay of Kotor, out of real Zeta itself, and the bishopric of Hum in Ston; both of these were almost on the outskirts of the kingdom, obviously with the aim to combat the Catholic action which had spread especially from the Catholic dioceses of Kotor and Dubrovnik. In earlier times, also Eastern Orthodox monasteries were subjected to the supervision of the Catholic Archdiocese of Bar; after Sava's action that intercourse began to change in the opposite direction. After Sava's organization, Eastern Orthodoxy became the state religion of Serbia. Sava, in that respect, worked consistently and without any regard. The Bogomils had been prohibited already by his father, Nemanja, while Sava, as an Athonite Latinophobe, did his part all to prevent and weaken the influence of Catholicism. Through his clergy, which he directly influenced as an example and with teaching, Sava rose also the general cultural level of the whole people, striving to develop human virtues and a sense of civic duty. The Serbian state thought of the Nemanjić dynasty was created politically by Nemanja, but spiritually and intellectually by Sava.

=== First pilgrimage ===
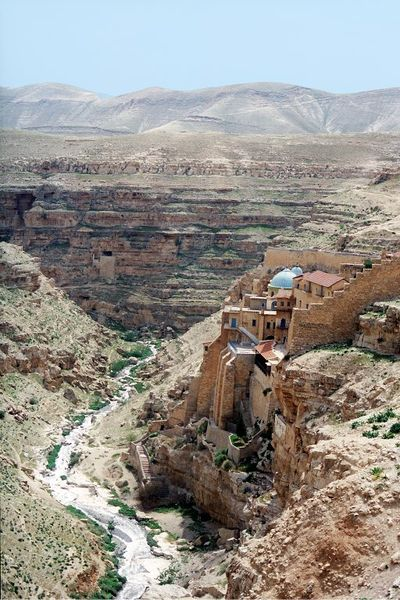
Mar Saba, where Sava founded Serbian cells

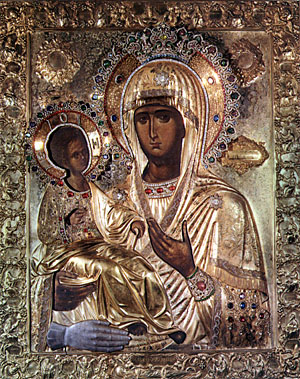
Trojeručica, a famous Serbian Orthodox icon

After the crowning of his nephew Radoslav, the son of Stefan, Sava left the Serbian maritime in 1229 for a trip to Palestine. He visited almost all the holy places and endowed them with valued gifts. The Patriarch of Jerusalem, Athanasius, along with the rest of the prelates, and especially monks, warmly greeted and welcomed him. Sava asked Athanasios II, his host, and the Great Lavra fraternity, led by hegoumenos Nicholas, if he could purchase two monasteries in the Holy Land. His request was accepted and he was offered the monasteries of Saint John the Theologian on Mount Sion and St. George's Monastery at Akkon - both to be inhabited by Serbian monks. On the way back he visited Nicaea and the Byzantine Emperor John Vatatzes (r. 1221–1254), where he remained for several days. From there, he continued his journey to Mount Athos, Hilandar, and then via Thessaloniki to Serbia. While visiting Mar Saba, he had been gifted the Trojeručica (the "Three-handed Theotokos"), an icon of Nursing Madonna, and the crosier of Sabbas the Sanctified, which he brought to Hilandar. After a short stay at Studenica, Sava embarked on a four-year trip throughout the lands where he confirmed the theological teachings and delivered constitutions and customs of monastic life to be kept, as he had seen in Mount Athos, Palestine, and the Middle East.

=== Second pilgrimage and death ===
After the throne change in 1234, when King Radoslav was succeeded by his brother Vladislav, Archbishop Sava began his second trip to the Holy Land. Prior to this, Sava had appointed his loyal pupil Arsenije Sremac as his successor to the throne of the Serbian Archbishopric. Domentijan says that Sava chose Arsenije through his "clairvoyance", with Teodosije stating further that he was chosen because Sava knew he was "evil-less and more just than others, prequalified in all, always fearing God and carefully keeps His commandments". This move was wise and deliberate; still in his lifetime he chose himself a worthy successor because he knew that the further fate of the Serbian Church largely depended on the personality of the successor.

Sava began his trip from Budva, then via Brindisi in Italy to Acre. On this road he experienced various bad events, such as an organized pirate attack in the rough Mediterranean Sea, which however ended well. In Acre he stayed in his monastery dedicated to St. George, which he had earlier bought from the Latins, and then from there went to Jerusalem, to the Monastery of St. John the Apostle, "which he, as soon as arriving, redeemed from the Saracens, in his name". Sava had a prolonged stay in Jerusalem; he was again friendly and brotherly received by Patriarch Athanasius. From Jerusalem he went to Alexandria, where he visited Patriarch Nicholas, with whom he exchanged gifts.

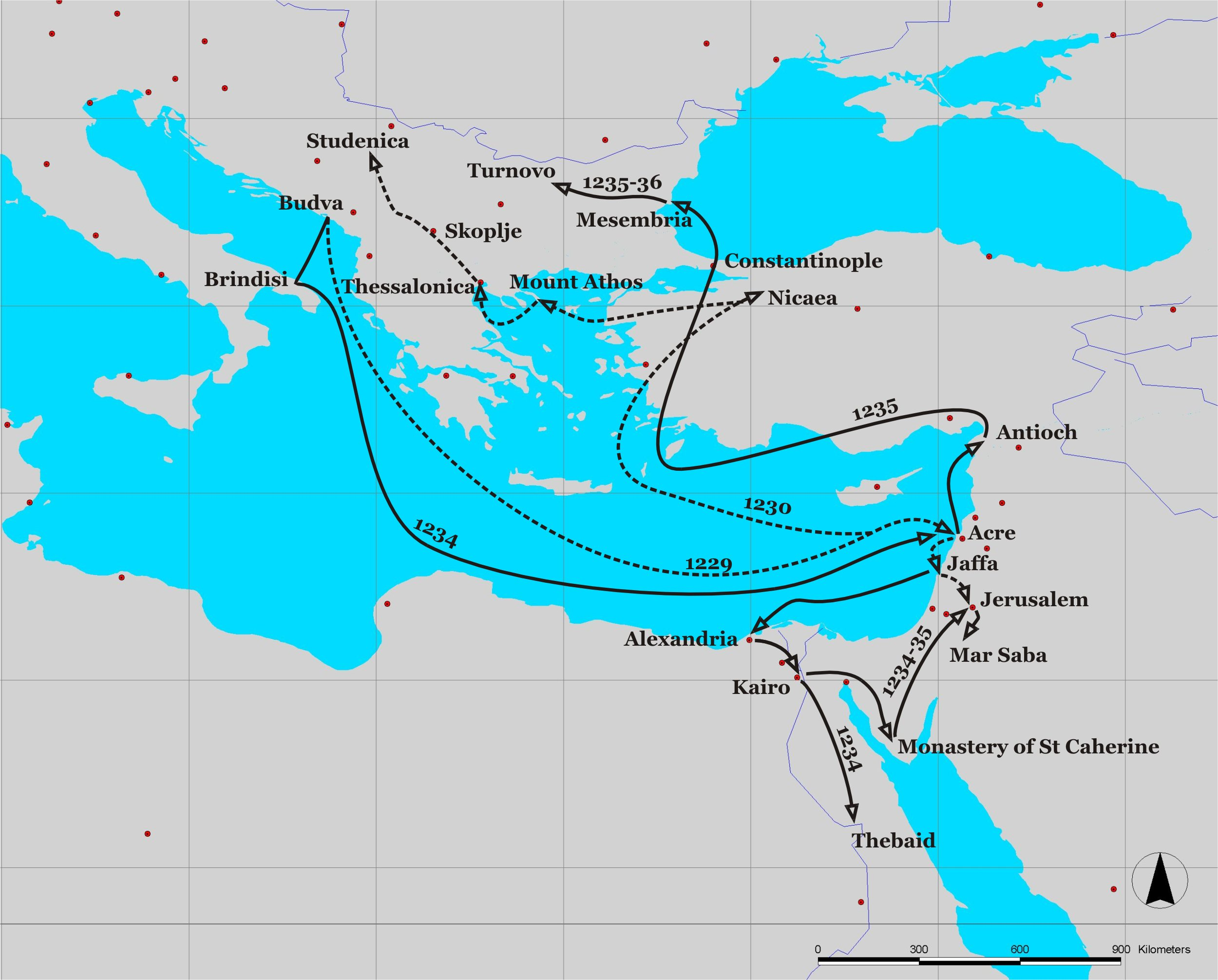
Sava's pilgrimages to the Holy Land, Egypt and Constantinople

After touring the holy places in Egypt, he returned to Jerusalem, from where he went to the Sinai, where he spent Lent. He returned briefly to Jerusalem, then went to Antiochia, and from there across Armenia and the "Turkic lands" he went on the "Syrian Sea" and then returned on a ship to Antiochia. On the ship, Sava became sick, and was unable to eat. After a longer trip he arrived at Constantinople where he briefly stayed. Sava first wanted to return home via Mount Athos (according to Domentijan), but he instead decided to visit the Bulgarian capital at Tarnovo, where he was warmly and friendly admitted by the Bulgarian Emperor Ivan Asen II (father-in-law of King Vladislav) and Bulgarian Patriarch Joakim.

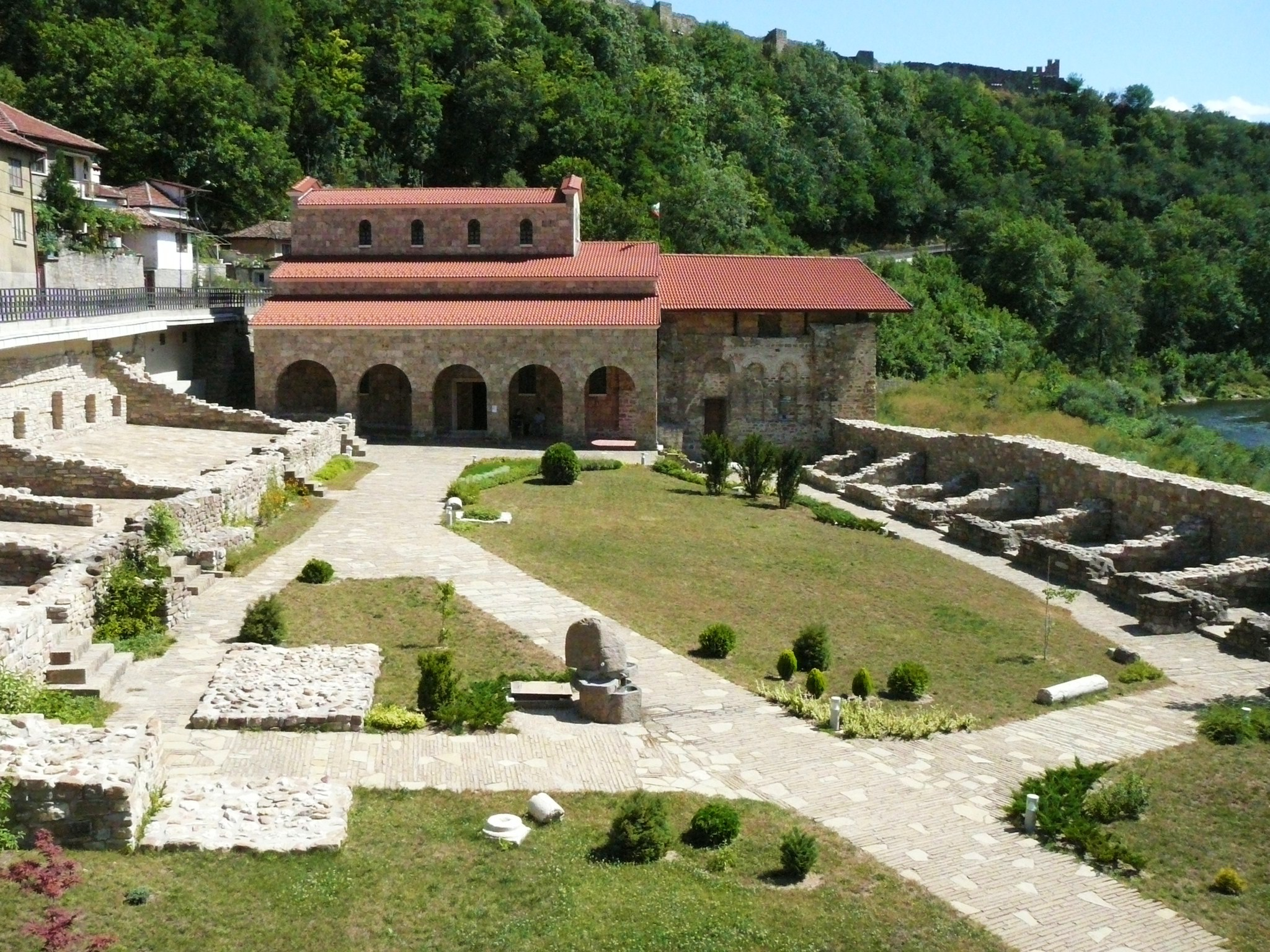
Sava died ill on his way home from the Holy Land, on 14 January 1235, in Tarnovo, Bulgarian Empire

As on all his destinations, he gave rich gifts to the churches and monasteries: "[he] gave also to the Bulgarian Patriarchate priestly honourable robes and golden books and candlesticks adorned with precious stones and pearls and other church vessels", as written by Teodosije. Sava had after much work and many long trips arrived at Tarnovo a tired and sick man. When the sickness took a hold of him and he saw that the end was near, he sent part of his entourage to Serbia with the gifts and everything he had bought with his blessing to give "to his children". The eulogia consisted of four items. Domentijan accounted that he died between Saturday and Sunday, on 14 January 1235.

Sava was respectfully buried at the Holy Forty Martyrs Church. Sava's body was returned to Serbia after a series of requests, and was then buried in the Mileševa monastery, built by Vladislav in 1234. According to Teodosije, Archbishop Arsenije told Vladislav "It's neither nice nor pleasing, before God nor the people, leaving our father [Sava] gifted to us by the Christ. An equal to apostles – who made so many feats and countless efforts for the Serbian lands, decorating it with churches and the kingdom, the archbishopric and bishops, and all constitutions and laws – that his relics lie outside his fatherland and the seat of his church, in a foreign land". King Vladislav twice sent delegations to his father-in-law Asen, asking him to let the relics of Sava be transferred to the fatherland, but the Emperor was unappealing. Vladislav then personally visited him and finally got the approval, and brought the relics to Serbia. With the highest church- and state honours, the relics of Saint Sava were transferred from the Holy Forty Martyrs Church to Mileševa on 6 May 1237. "The King and the Archbishop, with the bishops and hegumens and many noblemen, all together, little and great, carried the Saint in much joy, with psalms and songs". Sava was canonized, and his relics were considered miraculous; his cult remained throughout the Middle Ages and Ottoman rule.

== Legacy ==
=== Sainthood ===
Saint Sava is the protector of the Serbs: he is venerated as a protector of many churches, families, schools and artisans. His feast day is named Savindan/Savićevo ("Sava's day"). He is also commemorated by Greeks, Bulgarians, Romanians and Russians. In Romania, his feast day is a holiday. In Russia, he was mentioned as early as the 13th century in the Tver typikon.

Saint Sava is also venerated in the Catholic Church. Pope John Paul II stated Sava of Serbia as Saint and Church father. Several Catholic authors have written works dedicated to him, such as Venetians Jerolim Kavanjin, Marin Držić, Antun Sasin, Ivan Josip Pavlović Lučić, Franciscan Andrija Kačić Miošić and the Primate of Serbia, the Benedictine archbishop Andrija Zmajević; the Ragusan Benedictine Mavro Orbini and the poet Ivan Gundulić; and Bosnians Stefan Vukčić Kosača, Katarina Kosača and the Jesuit Bishop of Bosnia Ivan Tomko Mrnavić.

Antun Sasin wrote his epic poem "Razboji od Turka - Looms from the Turks" about the war between Turkey and Austria in the years 1593-1595. In VII "Razboj" he sings about the downfall of the Turks during the siege of Ostrogon:

"When thunder and lightning killed seven thousand Turks towards Buda, about fifteen days ago, because the glory of God is possible, which wants to avenge and show its glory, because the glorious Sava is burning, it wants to burn them with fire. The others fled, those who were left alive, and whom the lightning didn't strike, and everyone fled wherever they could."

— Antun Sasin, Razboji od Turka

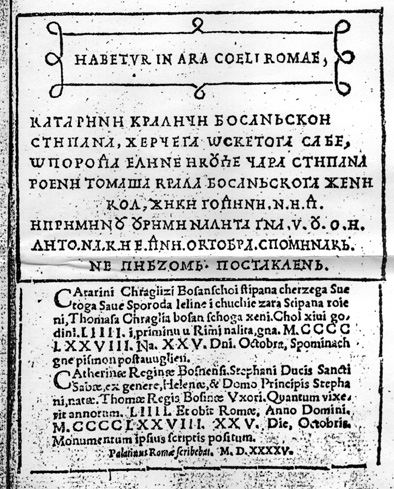
Queen Katarina Kosača Duchess of Saint Sava tombstone (d. 1478), daughter of Duke Stefan Kosača, shows her father's title: "Duchess of Saint Sava", as well as the kinship of her mother Jelena Balšić with the Serbian Emperor Stefan Dušan.

Mavro Orbin talks about him and his family in Il Regno de gli Slavi.

The third is our Sava, a distinguished descendant of Simeon Stephen, King of Serbia, who in the thirteenth century, with the sanctity of his morals, illuminated the royal progeny of his people and nation, Serbs. [...] The third is our Sava, the illustrious offspring of Simeon Stephen of Serbia, King of Serbia, who in the thirteenth century, with the sanctity of his morals, illuminated the royal progeny of his people [...] He burst into Serbia. and when war was declared against the relics of the Holy Bishop, at the town of Mileseva, where they are worshipped with great veneration [...] these are the relics of the most holy bishop, who are today the enemies of the Christian name, the Turks, the destroyers of the Catholic union, especially worshipped, whose sacred relics, although they were scorched by the flames of the impure Sinan, nevertheless remain in a sacred place, the tomb of the Holy man, in the same sacred place where he once rested, the same honor that was solemnly attested before, by the assiduous pilgrimage of the Illyrians [...] St. Sava the Abbot of the Nemanijic Family [...] Pray for us, Saint Sava, that we may be made worthy of the promises of Christ. Let us pray. Almighty and merciful God, who taught Blessed Sava the Pontiff to pass with all his heart from earthly principality to the humble following of your Cross, and who wished him to shine with pastoral solicitude, we beseech you, through his intercession, that, free from earthly affections, we may be able to serve you with a free mind, and to enjoy heavenly company among the sheep of your pasture. Through our Lord, etc.

— Ivan Tomko Mrnavić, Vita s. Sabbae - Episcopi Simeonis Stephani Regis filii

Andrija Zmajević dedicated his chronicle to him. Jerolim Kavanjin wrote poems about Serbian saints, whom "the Serbian sea brought". Andrija Kačić Miošić mentioned him in his A Pleasant Conversation of the Slavic People.

A church hymn about him (Serbian: Химна Светом Сави, romanized: Himna Svetom Savi) was sung in Serbian in the Catholic Church Sistine Chapel, Apostolic Palace, official seat of the Pope, Vatican City, Holy See. The Pope Francis was attended and present at the praise.

Numerous toponyms and other testimonies, preserved to this day, convincingly speak of the prevalence of the cult of St. Sava. St. Sava is regarded the father of Serbian education and literature; he authored the Life of St. Simeon (Stefan Nemanja, his father), the first Serbian hagiography. He has been given various honorific titles, such as "Father" and "Enlightener". Bishop of Bosnia Giovanni Thomas Marnavich wrote about him.

=== Relics ===
The presence of the relics of St. Sava in Serbia had a church-religious and political significance, especially during the Ottoman period. No individual among the Serbs has been woven into the consciousness and being of the people as Saint Sava, from his time until the present day. In 1377, Bosnian Ban Tvrtko was crowned King in the presence of Sava's relics. In 1448, vojvoda Stefan Vukčić Kosača of Hum styled himself "herzog (duke) of Saint Sava".

The cult collected all South Slavic peoples, especially the Orthodox Serbs. His grave was also a pilgrim site for Catholics and Muslims. Foreign 16th-century writers, Jean Sesno (1547) and Catherine Zen (1550) noted that Muslims respected the tomb of Saint Sava, and feared him. Benedicto Ramberti (1553) said that Turks and Jews gave more charity to Mileševa than Serbs.

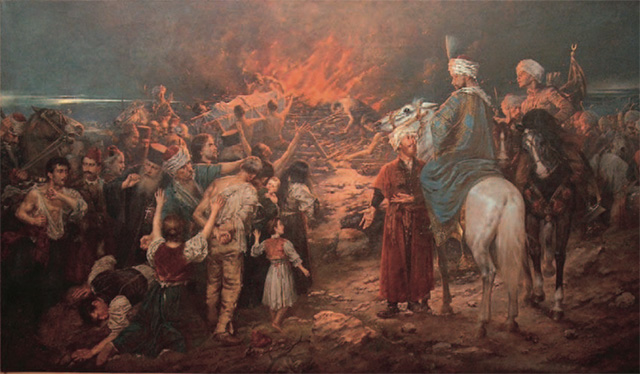
The burning of Saint Sava's relics by the Ottomans after the Banat Uprising, on April 27, 1595. Painting by Stevan Aleksić (1912)

==== Burning of relics ====
When the Serbs in Banat rose up against the Ottomans in 1594, using the portrait of Saint Sava on their war flags, the Ottomans retaliated by incinerating the relics of St. Sava on the Vračar plateau in Belgrade. Grand Vizier Koca Sinan Pasha, the main commander of the Ottoman army, ordered for the relics to be brought from Mileševa to Belgrade, where he set them on fire on 27 April. Monk Nićifor of the Fenek monastery wrote that "there was great violence carried out against the clergy and devastation of monasteries".

The Ottomans sought to symbolically and really, set fire to the Serb determination of freedom, which had become growingly noticeable. The event, however, sparked an increase in rebel activity, until the suppression of the uprising in 1595. It is believed that his left hand was saved; it is currently held at Mileševa.

The Church of Saint Sava was built near the place where his relics were burned. Its construction began in the 1930s and was completed in 2004. It is one of the largest churches in the world.

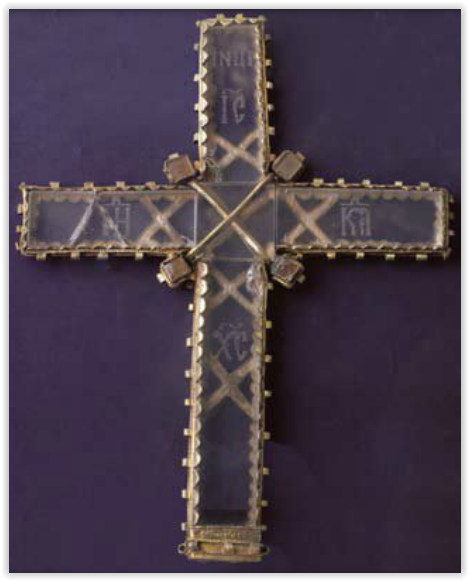
Saint Sava Crystal cross, 13th century, Savina Monastery, Herceg Novi, Montenegro

=== Divine Services ===
Divine Services, službe, were created in his honour following his burial. The earliest service date to the reign of king Vladislav, in which Saint Sava is mentioned along the killed monks on Sinai. In it, he is compared to Saints Sergius and Bacchus, whose relics are held at the Mileševa monastery. In the service, he is called an illuminator on earth, and the adoration of his icon is mentioned.

There are two services dedicated to Saint Sava: one dedicated to his Assumption (death), and the second to the translation of his relics. Nikola and Radoslav wrote the service on the translation of his relics c. 1330. Other services dedicated to the translation were also compiled in 1599 by inok Georgije, and written by protohegumen Visarion of Zavala in 1659–60. These services were superseded by the use of Teodosije's service.

The unknown author of the Service of the Assumption of Saint Sava, a monk of Mileševa, speaks to him: "Father of Fathers – [of] clergy rules, wholewised model, virtue of monks, fortification of the church, lighthouse of love, seat of feelings, source of mercifulness, fire-inspired tongue, mouth of sweet words, a church vessel of God, intellectual heaven become – God-good hierarch of Christ".

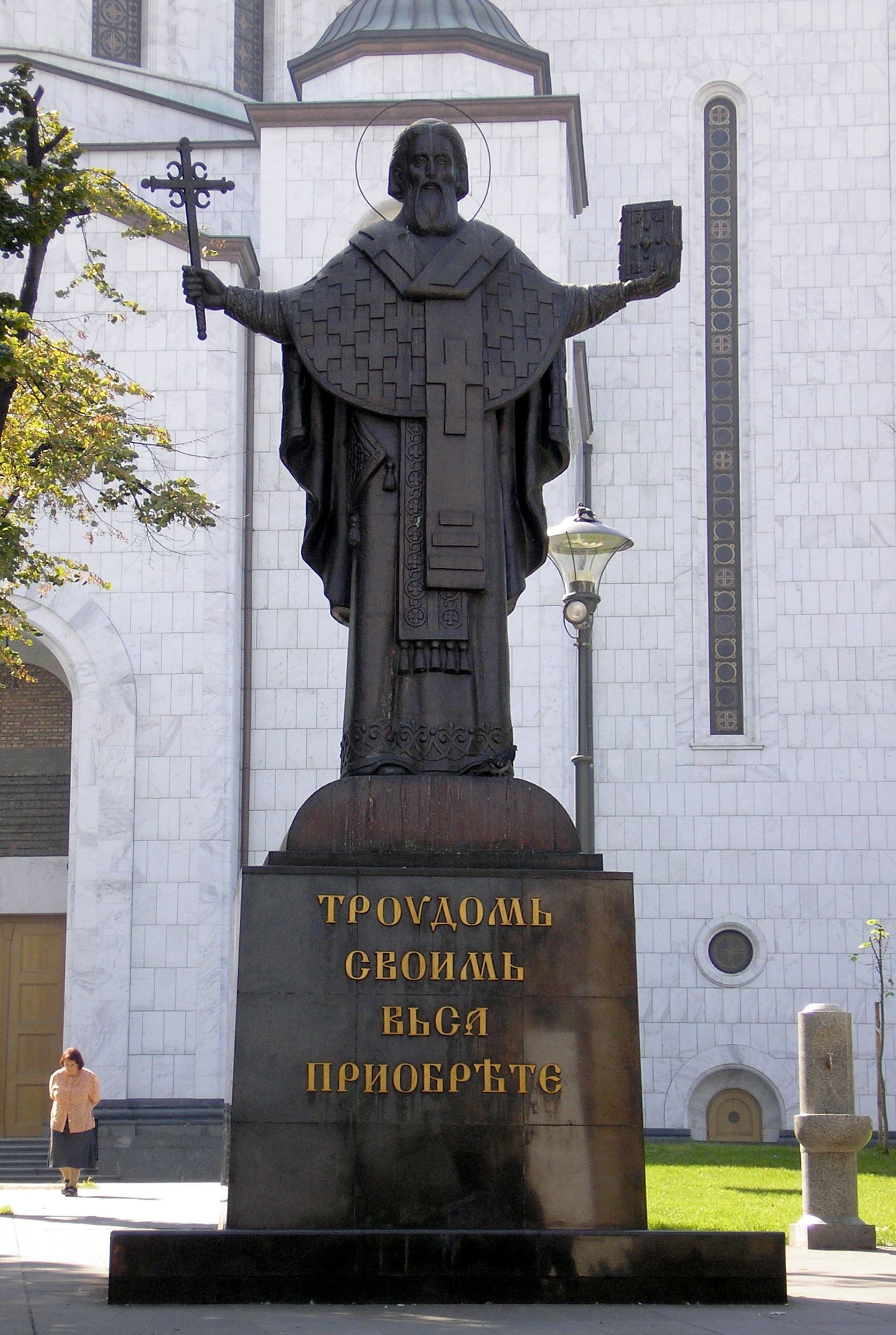
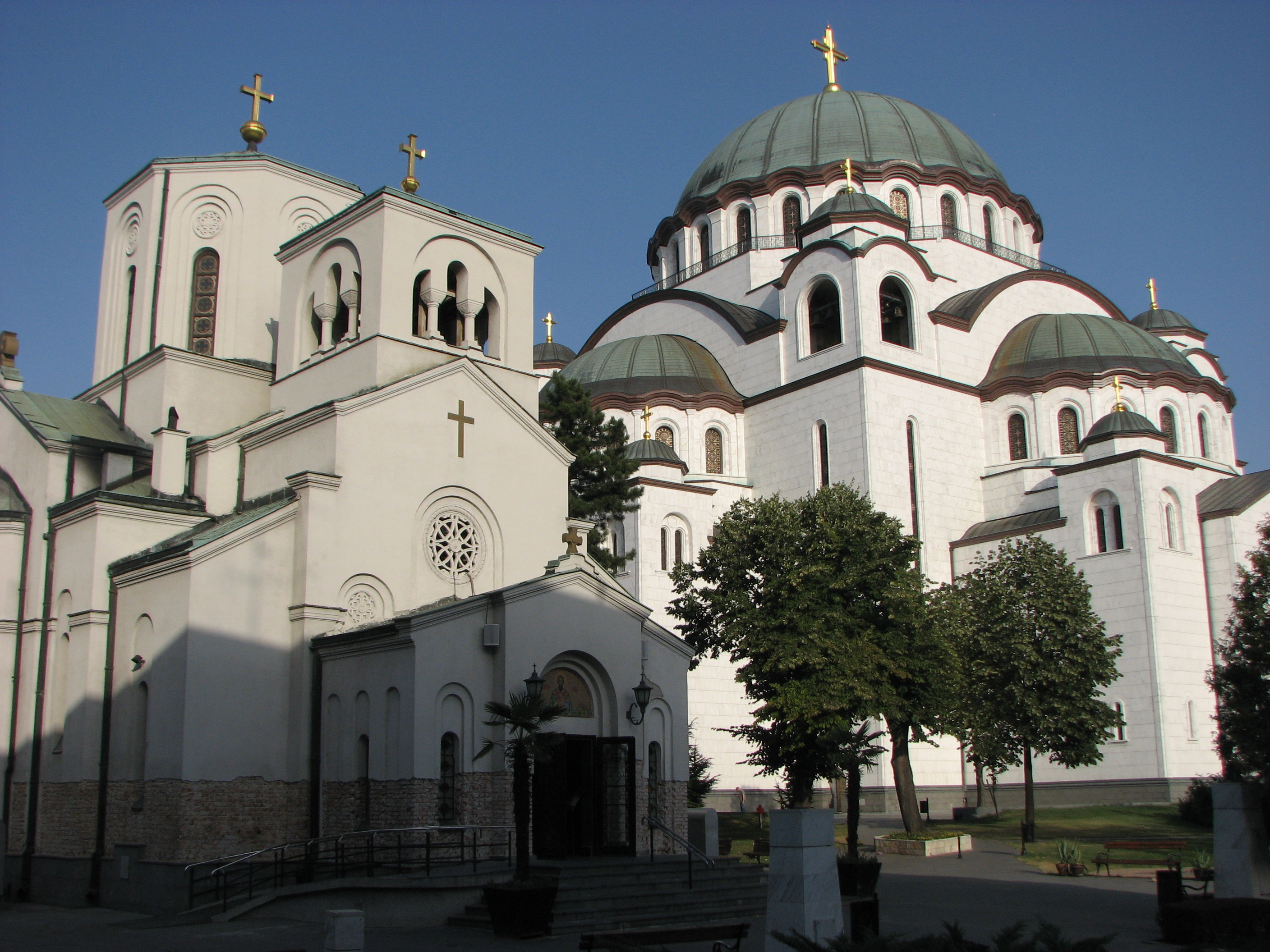
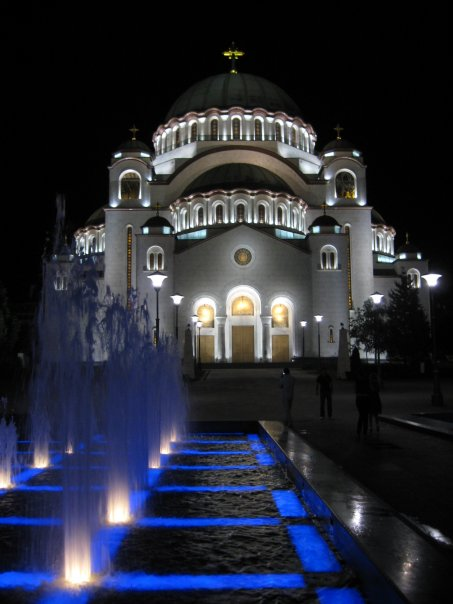
Monument, complex (day) and front walk (night) of the Church of Saint Sava,
one of the largest churches in the world.

=== Churches dedicated to St. Sava ===
There are many temples dedicated to Sava. As early as the beginning of the 14th century, Serbian Archbishop Nikodim I (s. 1316–1324) dedicated a church to him. Helena of Bulgaria, the wife of Emperor Stefan Dušan (r. 1331–55), founded a chapel on the top of the tower in Karyes, dedicated to St. Simeon and St. Sava.

One of the churches of Rossikon on Mount Athos, and a church in Thessaloniki, are dedicated to him. Churches throughout Serbia, Bosnia and Herzegovina, Croatia and Montenegro are dedicated to him, as well as churches in diaspora communities all around the world.

=== Visual arts ===
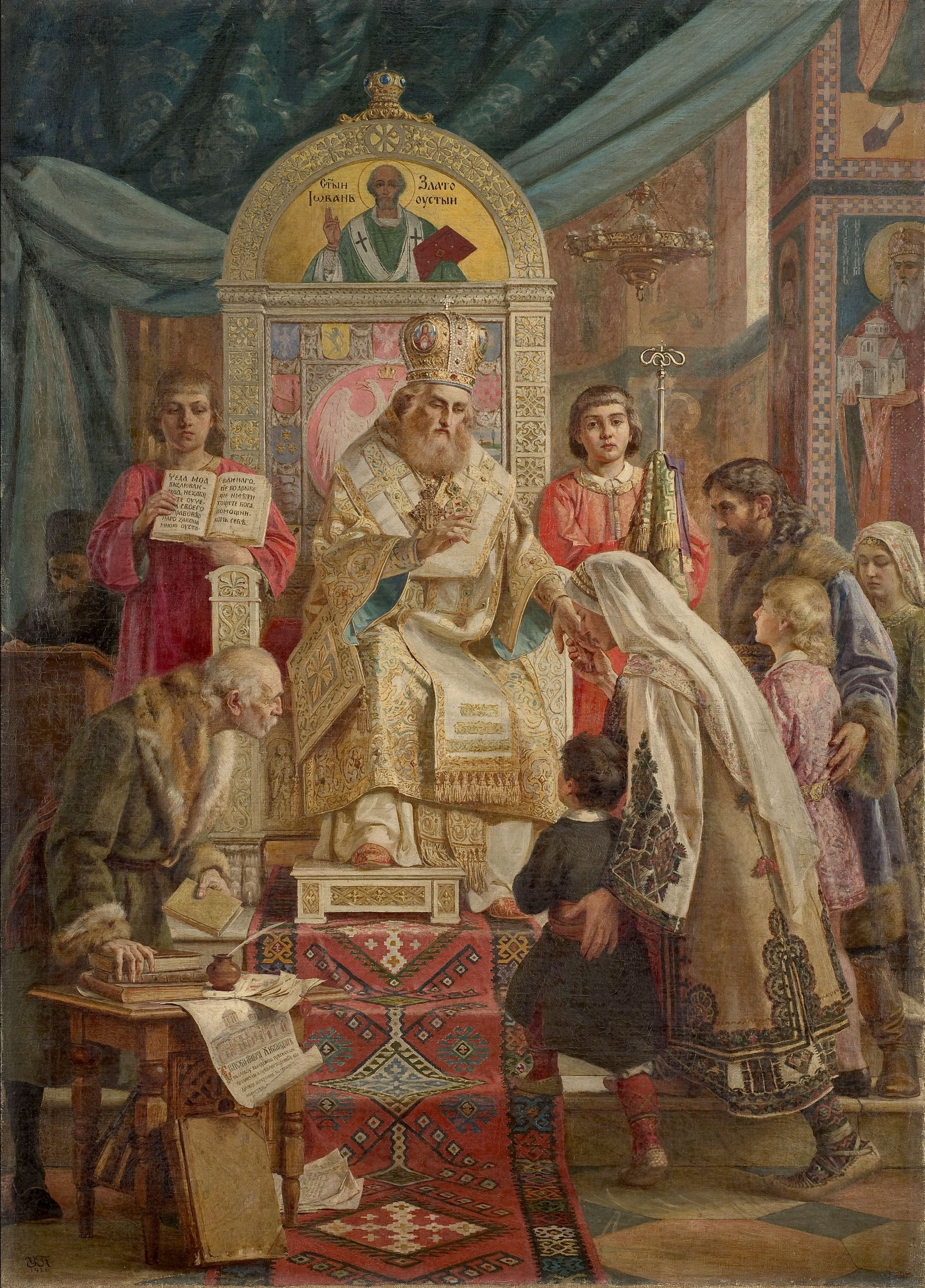
Sava blessing Serb youth, Uroš Predić, 1921

There are close to no Serbian churches that do not have a depiction of St. Sava. He is most often depicted as an archiereus (arhijerej, main priest), or together with his father, St. Simeon.

The most notable of his fresco depictions are located in the monasteries of Studenica, Mileševa, Peć, Morača, Arilje, Sopoćani, Dečani, Hilandar, Bogorodica Ljeviška, Psača, Lesnovo, Marko's Monastery, Matejić, Nagoričano, Nikita, Andrijaš, Bela Crkva, Baljevac, Pavlica, Ljubostinja, Resava, Koporin, Prohor Pčinjski, Rudenica, Blagoveštenje and St. Nicholas in Ovčar, Ježevica, Poganovo and others; he is depicted with the Nemanjić dynasty (loza Nemanjića) in Dečani, Peć and Orahovica. The translation of his relics is illustrated in the church of the Gradac Monastery, and the Monastery of Peć (in the Bogorodica Odigitrije temple) the scene where Sava appoints his successor Arsenije is depicted.

In the Church of St. George, also in the Monastery of Peć, an assembly of Sava is depicted. Iconographer (zograf) Georgije Mitrofanović illustrated events from the Life of St. Sava in the dining room of Hilandar. "The Serbian miracle-workers" Sava and Simeon are depicted in the Archangel Sobor in Kremlin, in Moscow. In the chapel of the Rila Monastery in Bulgaria, the Life of St. Sava is depicted in eight compositions, and in the Athonite monastery of St. Panteleimon Monastery he is depicted as a monk.

St. Sava is depicted with St. Simeon on an icon from the 14th century held in the National Museum in Belgrade, and on an icon held in the National Museum in Bucharest. The pair is depicted on tens of icons held in Hilandar. Other icons of them are found in the monasteries of Lepavina and Krka, and on the triptych of Orahovica. On an icon of Morača, beside a scene from his life, he is depicted with St. Simeon, knez Stefan and St. Cyril the Philosopher.

Graphical illustrations of St. Sava are found in old Serbian printed books: Triode from the Mrkšina crkva printing house (1566), Zbornik of Jakov of Kamena Reka (1566), as well as Sabornik of Božidar Vuković (1546) where he is depicted with St. Simeon. There are notable depictions of Sava in chalcography, one of which was made by Zaharije Orfelin (1726–1785). In Hilandar, there are two wood-cuts depicting St. Sava and St. Simeon holding the Three-handed Theotokos icon. His person is illustrated on numerous liturgical metal and textile items, while he and scenes from his life are illuminated in many manuscripts and printed books.

=== Literature ===
Many Serbian poets have written poetry dedicated to Sava. These include Jovan Jovanović Zmaj's Pod ikonom Svetog Save and Suze Svetog Save, Vojislav Ilić's Sveti Sava and Srpkinjica, Milorad Popović Šapčanin's Svetom Savi, Aleksa Šantić's Pred ikonom Svetog Save, Pepeo Svetog Save and Sveti Sava na golgoti, Vojislav Ilić Mlađi's Sveti Sava, Nikolaj Velimirović's Svetitelju Savo, Reči Svetog Save and Pesma Svetom Savi, Milan Petrović's Sveti Sava, Vasko Popa's St. Sava's Journey, Momčilo Tešić's Svetom Savi, Desanka Maksimović's Savin monolog, Matija Bećković's Priča o Svetom Savi, Mićo Jelić Grnović's Uspavanka, and others.

== Works ==
The earliest works of Sava were dedicated to ascetic and monastic life: the Karyes Typikon and Hilandar Typikon. In their nature, they are Church law, based strictly on non-literary works, however, in them some moments came to expression of indirect importance for the establishment of an atmosphere in which Sava's original and in the narrow sense, literary works, came to exist. In addition, characteristics of Sava's language and style come to light here, especially in those paragraphs which are his specific interpretations or independent supplements.

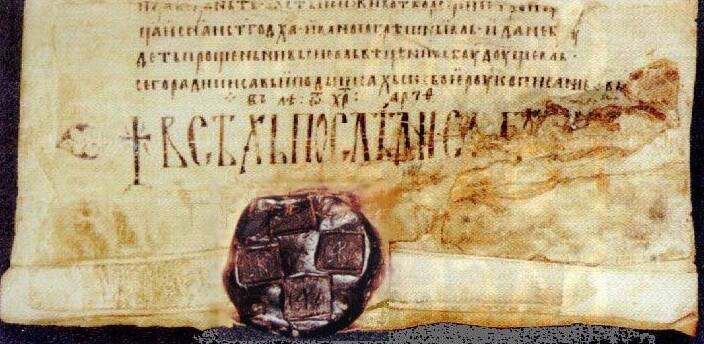
Karyes Typikon with Sava's signature, 1199

- Karyes Typikon, written for the Karyes cell in 1199. It is basically a translation from a standard Greek ascetic typikon. It became a model for Serbian solitary or eremitical monasticism also outside of Mount Athos.
- Hilandar Typikon, written for Hilandar in 1199. Compiled as a translation and adaptation of the introductory part of the Greek Theotokos Euergetis typikon from Constantinople. Sava only used some parts of that typikon, adding his own, different regulations tailored to the needs of Hilandar. He and his father had donated to the Euergetis monastery, and Sava stayed there on his trips to Constantinople, seemingly, he liked the order and way of life in this monastery. This typikon was to become the general managing order for other Serbian monasteries (with small modifications, Sava wrote the Studenica Typikon in 1208). The Hilandar Typikon contains regulations for the spiritual life in the monastery and organization of various services of the monastic community (opštežića).

The organization of the Serbian Church with united areas was set on a completely new basis. The activity of major monasteries developed; caretaking of missionary work was put under the duty of the protopopes. Legal regulations of the Serbian Church was constituted with a code of a new, independent, compilation of Sava – the Nomocanon or Krmčija; with this codification of Byzantine law, Serbia already at the beginning of the 13th century received a firm legal order and became a state of law, in which the rich Greek-Roman law heritage was continued.

- Nomocanon (Zakonopravilo) or Krmčija, most likely created in Thessaloniki in 1220, when Sava returned from Nicaea to Serbia, regarding the organization of the new, autocephalous Serbian Church. It was a compilation of state ("civil") law and religious rules or canons, with interpretations of famous Byzantine canonists, who by themselves were a kind of source of law. As Byzantine nomocanons, with or without interpretation, the Serbian Nomocanon was a capital source and monument of law; in the medieval Serbian state, it was the source of the first order as a "divine right"; after it, legislations of Serbian rulers (including Dušan's Code) were created. Sava was the initiator of the creation of this compilation, while the translation was likely the work of various authors, older and contemporary to Sava. An important fact is that the choice of compilation in this nomocanon was unique: it is not preserved in Greek manuscript tradition. In the ecclesiastic term, it is very characteristic, due to its opposing of that period's views in effect on church-state relations in Byzantium, and restoring of some older conceptions with which the sovereignty of divine law is insisted on.

His liturgical regulations include also Psalter-holding laws (Ustav za držanje Psaltira), which he translated from Greek, or as possibly is the case with the Nomocanon, was only the initiator and organizer, and supervisor of the translation. A personal letter of his, written from Jerusalem to his disciple hegumen Spiridon in Studenica, shows Sava getting closer to literature. This is the first work of the epistolary genre that has been preserved in the old Serbian literature.

Theologian Lazar Mirković noted "With a lot of feeling and longing for the fatherland in a distant world and caring for things in the homeland, Sava wrote this letter to Spiridon, reporting about him and his entourage, of them falling ill on the road, how they donated to the Holy sites, where he intended to travel, and along with the letter he sent gifts: a cross, pleat, cloth and pebbles. The cross and pleat had laid on Christ's grave, and hence these gifts received greater value. Sava perhaps found the cloth in Jordan". The letter has been preserved in 14th-century copies held in the Velika Remeta monastery. The proper literary nature of Sava is revealed only in his hagiographical and poetic compositions. Each in its genre, they stand at the beginning of the development of convenient literary genres in the independent Serbian literature.

In the Hilandar Typikon, Sava included the Short Hagiography of St. Simeon Nemanja, which tells of Simeon's life between his arrival at Hilandar and death. It was written immediately after his death, in 1199 or 1200. The developed hagiography on St. Simeon was written in the introduction of the Studenica Typikon.

- Hagiography of St. Simeon, written in 1208 as a ktetor hagiography of the founder of Studenica. It was made according to the rules of Byzantine literature. The hagiography itself, biography of a saint, was one of the main prose genres in Byzantium. Hagiographies were written to create or spread the cult of the saint, and communicated the qualities of and virtues of the person in question. The work focused on the monastic character of Simeon, using biographical information as a subset to his renouncing of the throne, power and size in the world for the Kingdom of Heaven. Simeon is portrayed as a dramatic example of renouncing earthly life, as a representative of basic evangelical teachings and foundations of these, especially of monastic spirituality. His biographical pre-history (conquests and achievements) with praises are merged in the prelude, followed by his monastic feats and his death, ending with a prayer instead of praise. The language is direct and simple, without excessive rhetorics, in which a close witness and companion, participant in the life of St. Simeon, is recognized (in Sava). Milan Kašanin noted that "no old biography of ours is that little pompous and that little rhetorical, and that warm and humane as Nemanja's biography".

Very few manuscripts of the works of St. Sava have survived. Apart from the Karyes Typikon, of which a copy, a scroll, is today held at Hilandar, it is believed that there are no original manuscripts (authograph) of St. Sava. The original Charter of Hilandar (1198) was lost in World War I.

St. Sava is regarded as the great of independent medieval Serbian literature.

== Ktetor ==
Sava founded and reconstructed churches and monasteries wherever he stayed. While staying at Vatopedi, even before the arrival of his father in 1197, he founded three chapels (paraklisi). He had the monastery church covered in lead, and was regarded as the second ktetor, also having donated highly valuable ecclesiastical art objects. Together with his father he was the great, second ktetor of the monasteries of Iviron, Great Lavra and churches in Karyes. The most important was Hilandar, together with his father (1198).

He then founded the cell at Karyes, and in 1199 became ktetor of three more Athonite monasteries: Karakallou, Xeropotamou, and Philotheou. In 1197 he gave a large contribution to the Constantinopolitan monastery of the Holy Mother of God Euergetes, and did the same to Philokallou in Thessaloniki; "due to him also giving much gold for the erection of that monastery, the population there regard him the ktetor", according to Teodosije.

Returning to Serbia in 1206, Sava continued his work. The Mother of God Church in Studenica was painted, and two hermitages near Studenica were endowed. His most important architectural work was the Home of the Holy Saviour, called Žiča, the first seat of the Serbian Archbishopric. In Peć he built the Church of the Holy Apostles, and he was also involved in the building of the Mileševa Monastery. In Palestine, on Mount Sinai, he founded the Monastery of St. John the Apostle, as a shelter for Serbs on pilgrimage. Sava donated gold to many monasteries in Palestine, Thessaloniki, and especially Mount Athos. His ktetor activity was an expression of deep devotion and sincere loyalty to Christian ideals.

- Hilandar Monastery on Mount Athos
- Karyes monastery cell (see: Karyes Typicon)
- Church of John the Apostle in Jerusalem

And many other churches across Serbia, as well.

Reconstructions

- Monastery of Vatopedi on Mount Athos
- Philotheou monastery on Mount Athos
- Xeropotamou monastery on Mount Athos
- Karakallou monastery on Mount Athos
- Saint Andrew's church in Constantinople
- Studenica monastery in Kraljevo
- Church of the Holy Apostles in Peć
- Mileševa monastery in Prijepolje
- Mar Saba monastery in Bethlehem

Donations

- Iviron monastery on Mount Athos
- The Monastery of Great Lavra on Mount Athos
- Mother's Mary monastery in Solun
- Filokala monastery in Solun
- Žiča monastery in Kraljevo
- Church of Christ's birth in Bethlehem
- An unnamed Georgian monastery in Jerusalem
- Church of St. Lazarus of Bethany in Jerusalem
- Church of St. Zechariah in Jerusalem
- Saint Mary's church in Nazareth

And many other donations in Jerusalem and Serbia.

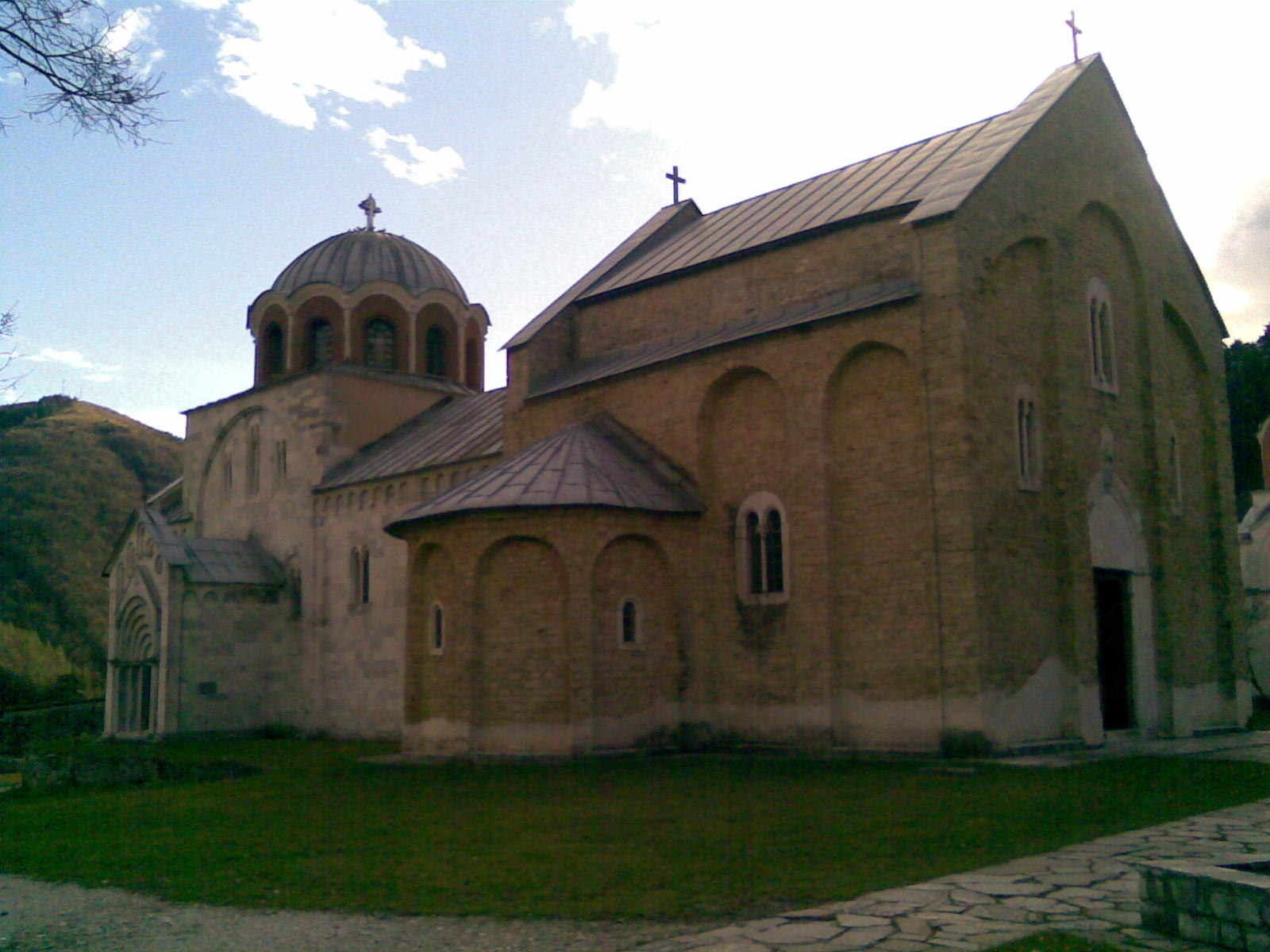
Studenica

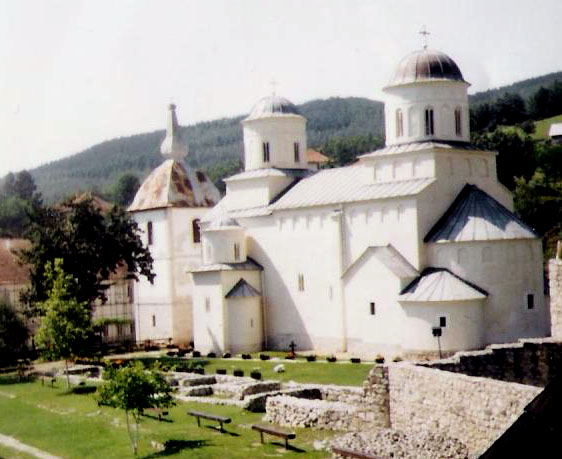
Mileševa

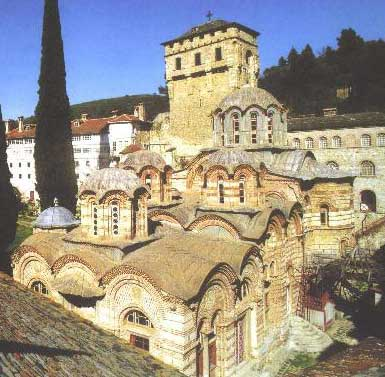
Hilandar

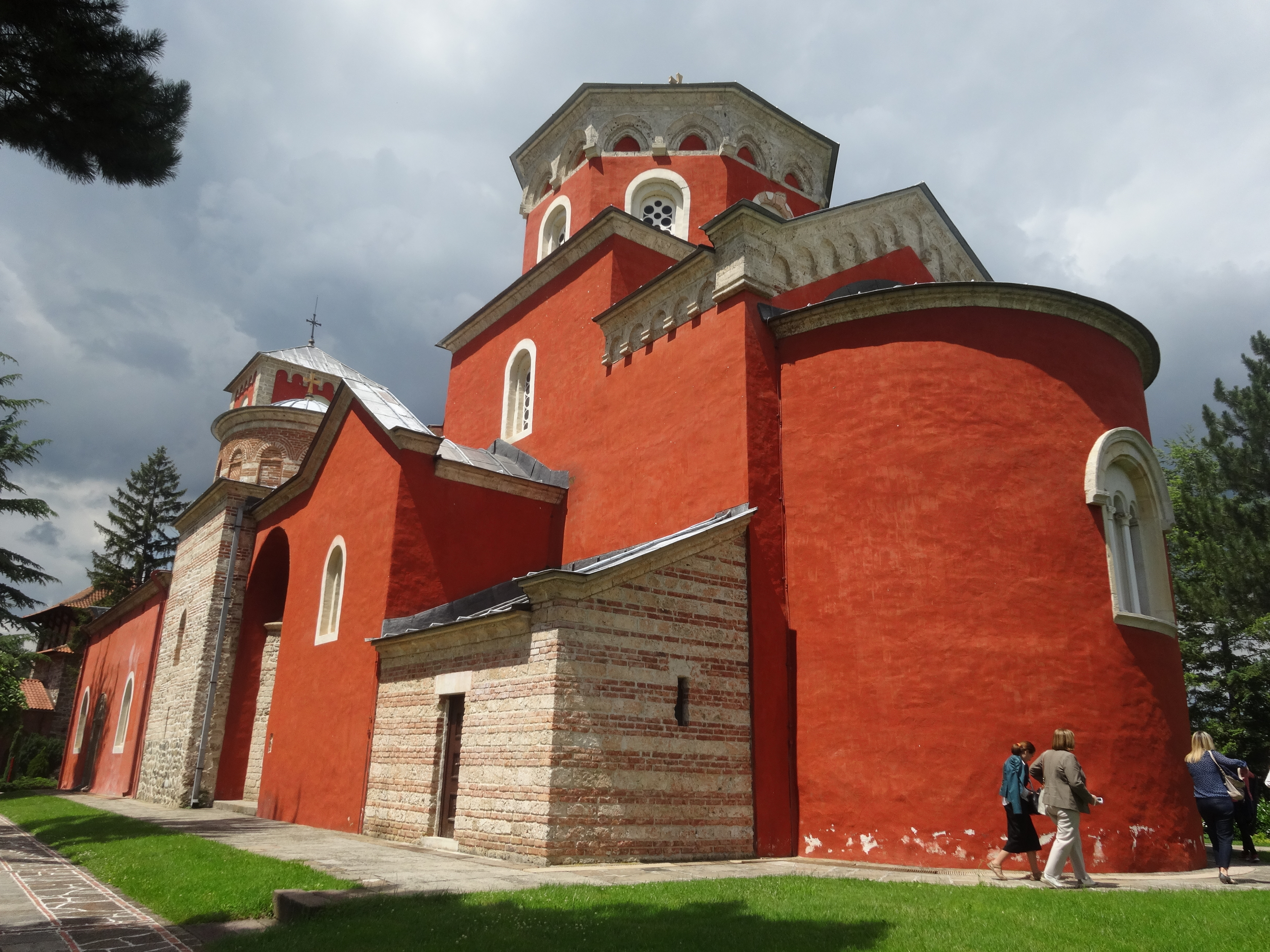
Žiča

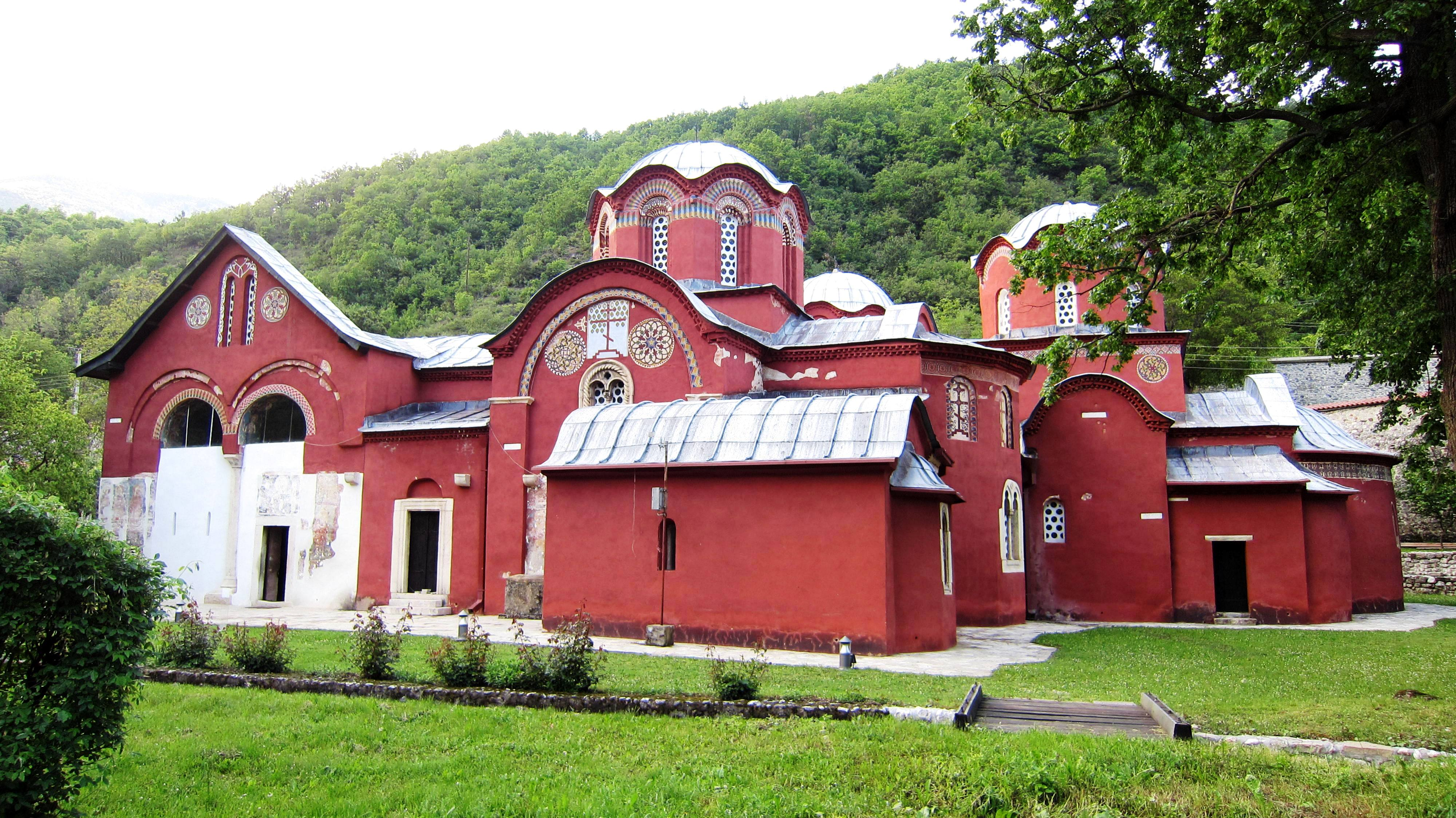
Patriarchate of Peć

== See also ==
- List of saints of the Serbian Orthodox Church
- List of Eastern Orthodox saints
- List of heads of the Serbian Orthodox Church
- Order of St. Sava

Eastern Orthodox Church titles
First Founding of Serbian Church	Serbian Archbishop; December 6, 1219 – 1233	Succeeded by Arsenije
Royal titles
Preceded by Miroslav	Prince of Hum under Stefan Nemanja; 1190 – 1192	Succeeded by Miroslav or Toljen

== Annotations ==
1. Sources puts the year of his birth in either 1169 or 1174. The official site of the Serbian Orthodox Church put it "around year 1174". Historians Slobodan Mileusnić and Alexis Vlasto supports c. 1174.
2. Old Church Slavonic: Свѧтъ Сава Срьбски / Svet Sava Srbski; Glagolitic: Ⱄⰲⰵⱅⰻ Ⱄⰰⰲⰰ Ⱄⱃⰱⱄⰽⰻ / Sveti Sava Srbski; Greek: Άγιος Σάββας Σερβίας, romanized: Ágios Sávvas Servías
3. Throughout history, Sava has been given various honorific titles. He received the popular epithet "Illuminator (enlightener) of the Serbs". In other genealogies and chronicles, as well as in many records and inscriptions, he was given the titles: "First Archbishop and teacher and educator and with God enlighter of his fatherland", "First saint and teacher", "Great miracle-worker", etc. (for further information: Radovan Samardžić (1981). Pisci srpske istorije. Vol. 2. Prosveta. p. 19. ISBN 9788607007905.)

== Sources ==
- Bataković, Dušan T., ed. (2005). Histoire du peuple serbe [History of the Serbian People] (in French). Lausanne: L’Age d’Homme. ISBN 978-2825119587. Archived from the original on 2024-09-29.
- Blagojević, Miloš (1993). "On the National Identity of the Serbs in the Middle Ages". Serbs in European Civilization. Belgrade: Nova, Serbian Academy of Sciences and Arts, Institute for Balkan Studies. pp. 20–31. ISBN 978-8675830153.
- Bogdanović, Dimitrije (1999) [1986]. "Свети Сава – Сабрани списи" (Internet ed.). Просвета и Српска књижевна задруга.
- Carter, Francis W. (1969). "An Analysis of the Medieval Serbian Oecumene: A Theoretical Approach". Geografiska Annaler. Series B: Human Geography. 51 (1–2): 39–56. doi:10.1080/04353684.1969.11879331.
- Ćirković, Sima; Korać, Vojislav; Babić, Gordana (1986). Studenica Monastery. Belgrade: Jugoslovenska revija.
- Ćirković, Sima (2004). The Serbs. Malden: Blackwell Publishing. ISBN 978-1405142915. Archived from the original on 2025-03-11.
- Curta, Florin (2006). Southeastern Europe in the Middle Ages, 500–1250. Cambridge: Cambridge University Press. ISBN 978-0521815390.
- Curta, Florin (2018). "Angel on Earth and Heavenly Man: St. Sava of Serbia". Portraits of Medieval Eastern Europe, 900–1400. London: Routledge. pp. 91–99. ISBN 978-1138637047.
- Curta, Florin (2019). Eastern Europe in the Middle Ages (500–1300). Leiden and Boston: Brill. ISBN 978-9004395190.
- Dragojlović, Dragoljub (1993). "Serbian Spirituality in the 13th and 14th Centuries and Western Scholasticism". Serbs in European Civilization. Belgrade: Nova, Serbian Academy of Sciences and Arts, Institute for Balkan Studies. pp. 32–40. ISBN 978-8675830153.
- Dujčev, Ivan S. (1978). "Saint Sava à Turnovo en 1235". Хиландарски зборник. 4: 17–29.
- Dvornik, Francis (1962). The Slavs in European History and Civilization. New Brunswick: Rutgers University Press.
- Ferjančić, Božidar; Maksimović, Ljubomir (2014). "Sava Nemanjić and Serbia between Epiros and Nicaea". Balcanica (45): 37–54. doi:10.2298/BALC1445037F. hdl:21.15107/rcub_dais_12894.
- Fine, John Van Antwerp Jr. (1994) [1987]. The Late Medieval Balkans: A Critical Survey from the Late Twelfth Century to the Ottoman Conquest. Ann Arbor, Michigan: University of Michigan Press. ISBN 0472082604. Archived from the original on 2024-12-25.
- Jakovljević, Živojin (2015). "A Royal Family: The Significance of Saint Sava and his Parents for the Establishment of Serbian Monasticism and the Serbian Church". Orthodox Monasticism: Past and Present. Piscataway, NJ: Gorgias Press. pp. 423–432. ISBN 978-1463205300.
- Kalić, Jovanka (2017). "The First Coronation Churches of Medieval Serbia" (PDF). Balcanica (48): 7–18. doi:10.2298/BALC1748007K.
- Marjanović, Dragoljub (2018). "Emergence of the Serbian Church in Relation to Byzantium and Rome" (PDF). Niš and Byzantium. 16: 41–50. Archived (PDF) from the original on 2019-09-23.
- Marković, Miodrag (2009). "Saint Sava of Serbia and Athanasios II, the Patriarch of Jerusalem" (PDF). Niš and Byzantium. 7: 267–271.
- Matejić, Mateja (1976). Biography of Saint Sava. Columbus: Kosovo Publishing Company. ISBN 978-0915887002.
- Mileusnić, Slobodan (2000) [1989]. Sveti Srbi (in Serbian). Novi Sad: Prometej. ISBN 8676394784. OCLC 44601641.
- Miljković, Bojan (2008). "La vie de saint Sava de Serbie par Domentijan et les cultes des icônes athonites thaumaturges de la Vierge". Byzantion. 78: 304–338. JSTOR 44173078.
- Obolensky, Dimitri (1974) [1971]. The Byzantine Commonwealth: Eastern Europe, 500–1453. London: Cardinal. ISBN 978-0351176449. Archived from the original on 2024-09-30.
- Obolensky, Dimitri (1988). Six Byzantine Portraits. Oxford: Clarendon Press. ISBN 978-0198219514.
- Ostrogorsky, George (1956). History of the Byzantine State. Oxford: Basil Blackwell. Archived from the original on 2024-09-30.
- Popović, Svetlana (2002). "The Serbian Episcopal Sees in the Thirteenth Century". Старинар (51: 2001): 171–184.
- Radić, Radmila (2007). "Serbian Christianity". The Blackwell Companion to Eastern Christianity. Malden: Blackwell Publishing. pp. 231–248. ISBN 978-0470766392.
- Šarkić, Srđan (2011). "Some Remarks Concerning the Reception of Byzantine Law in Mediaeval Serbia" (PDF). Анали Правног факултета у Београду. 59 (3): 241–248.
- Sedlar, Jean W. (1994). East Central Europe in the Middle Ages, 1000–1500. Seattle: University of Washington Press. ISBN 978-0295800646. Archived from the original on 2023-05-23.
- Sotirović, Vladislav B. (2011). "The Serbian Patriarchate of Peć in the Ottoman Empire: The First Phase (1557–94)". Serbian Studies. 25 (2): 143–169. doi:10.1353/ser.2011.0038. Archived from the original on 2022-11-20.
- Speake, Graham (2018). A History of the Athonite Commonwealth: The Spiritual and Cultural Diaspora of Mount Athos. Cambridge: Cambridge University Press. ISBN 978-1108425865.
- Van Tricht, Filip (2011). The Latin Renovatio of Byzantium: The Empire of Constantinople (1204–1228). Leiden: Brill. ISBN 978-9004203235.
- Vlasto, Alexis P. (1970). The Entry of the Slavs into Christendom: An Introduction to the Medieval History of the Slavs. Cambridge: Cambridge University Press. ISBN 978-0521074599.
