= Metodije (medieval Serbian bishop) =

Metodije (fl. 1219) was the Serbian Orthodox bishop of Raška in the first half of the 13th century. He was the hegumen of Hilandar, serving Archbishop Sava. After the autocephaly of the Serbian Church (15 August 1219), Metodije was appointed the bishop of Raška and hieromonk Ilarion of Hilandar was appointed the bishop of Zeta; Raška and Zeta were the central regions of Serbia.

Religious titles
Preceded by ?	Bishop of Raška; 1219–?	Succeeded by ?
Preceded by ?	Hegumen of Hilandar ?–1219	Succeeded by ?
