= Karyes Typikon =

1199 typikon by Saint Sava

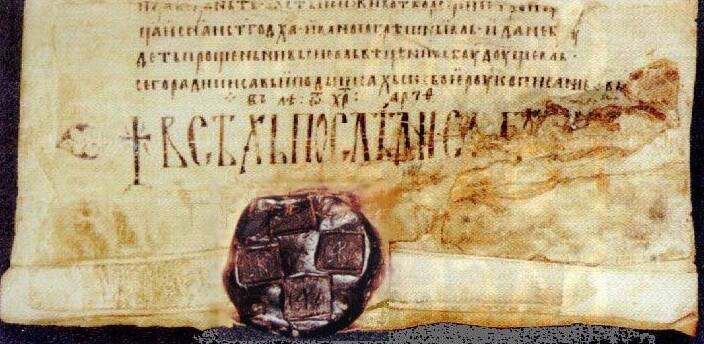
- The original document with the authentic signature of Sava
- Created: 1199
- Location: Mount Athos
- Author: Saint Sava
- Purpose: Typikon

The Karyes Typikon (Serbian: Карејски типик, romanized: Karejski tipik) was written for the Karyes cell on Mount Athos in 1199 by Saint Sava, at the time a monk and later the first Serbian Archbishop. It is basically a translation from a standard Greek ascetic typikon with some minor changes. It became a model for Serbian solitary or eremitical monasticism also outside of Mount Athos. It is published along with the Catalog of Cyrillic manuscripts from the Hilandar monastery since 1908.

== See also ==
- Studenica Typikon
- Charter of Hilandar
- Serbian manuscripts

== Sources ==
- Bogdanović, Dimitrije (1999) [1986]. "Свети Сава: Сабрани списи" (Internet ed.). Belgrade: Просвета, Српска књижевна задруга; Rastko. Archived from the original on 2009-02-24.
