= Ilarion (medieval Serbian bishop) =

Serbian Orthodox bishop of Zeta and Hum (fl. 1219)

Saint Ilarion I Šišević Иларион I Шишевић
- Bishop of Zeta; Bishop of Hum
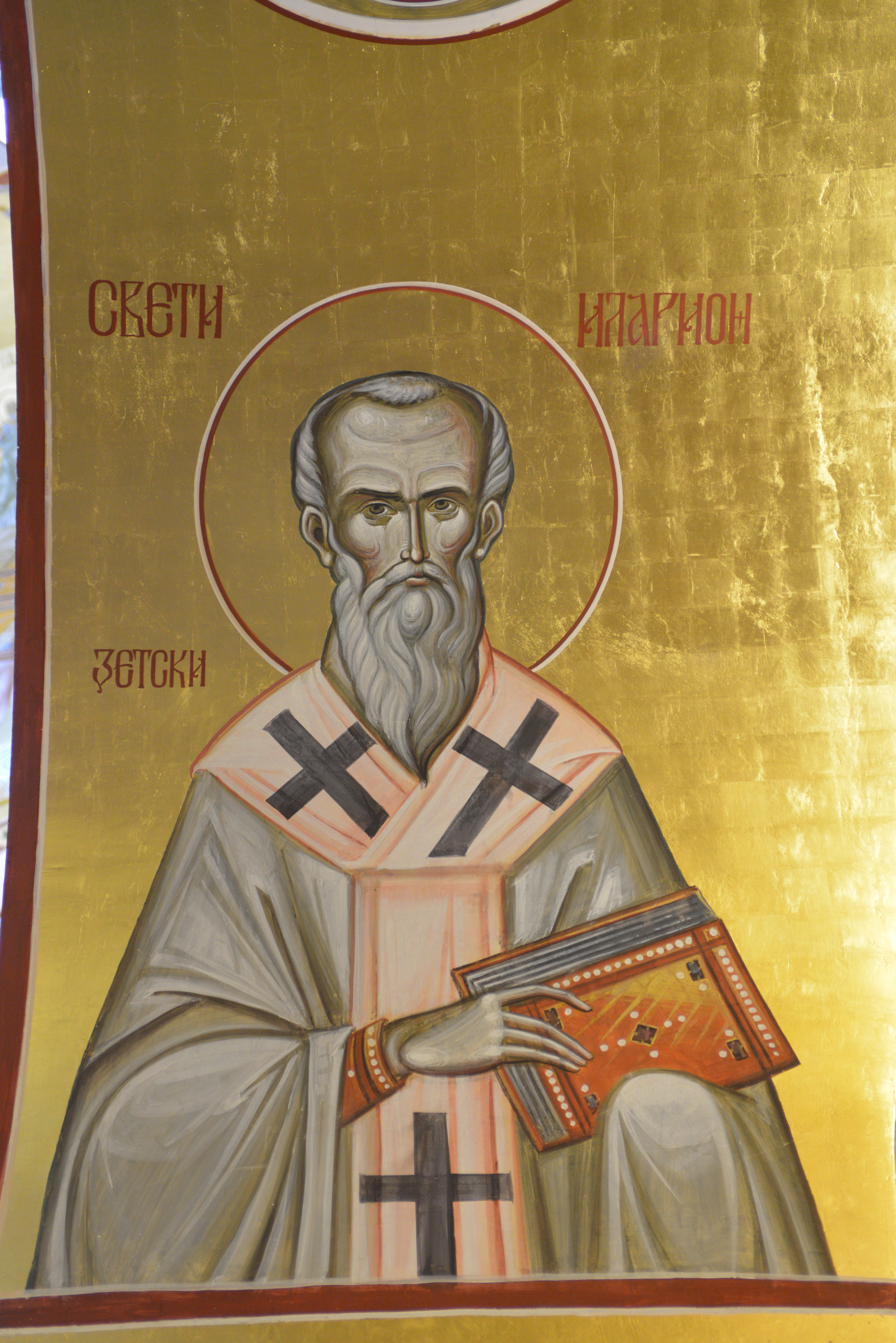
- "Saint Ilarion of Zeta" (Serbian Cyrillic: "Свети Иларион Зетски")
- Church: Serbian Orthodox Church
- Diocese: Eparchy of Zeta (1219–1346)
- Appointed: 1220
- Term ended: 1242
- Successor: German I

Personal details
- Born: Unknown Šišović village, Zeta
- Died: Unknown Vranjina, Zeta
- Buried: Vranjina, Zeta (modern Montenegro)
- Denomination: Serbian Orthodox

Ilarion (Anglicized: Hilarion; fl. 1219), also known as Ilarije or Ilarion Šišević (Serbian: Иларион Шишевић), was the first Serbian Orthodox bishop of Zeta and the bishop of Hum in the first half of the 13th century. He was a disciple of Archbishop Sava and a hieromonk of Hilandar during Sava's trip to the Patriarch Manuel I of Constantinople in Nicaea (1219).

== Biography ==
Based on local tradition, his surname suggests that he was born in the Šišović village which would later become part of the tribal region of Građani of the Riječka nahija.^{[a]}

In the historical-anthropological work Riječka nahija u Crnoj Gori (1911) by Andrija Jovićević, which was published in 1911, records about the origin of the family of Ilarion and the folk legend that he became a disciple of Saint Sava, the first archbishop of Serbia of the autocephalous Serbian Orthodox Church. Jovićević writes that Ilarion's grandfather was a Serb from Prizren and that his son Lješ moved to Zeta. Lješ also had four sons.

== Reign ==
After the autocephaly of the Serbian Church (15 August 1219), Saint Sava was consecrated as the first Archbishop of the Serbian Church, and the seat of the Archbishopric was established in Žiča.

On his way back from Nicaea Archbishop Sava has asked several hegumens to return with him. Metodije, the former hegumen of Hilandar, was appointed the bishop of Raška, and Ilarion, a prominent Hilandarian and Sava's collaborator, was appointed the bishop of Zeta; Raška (central Serbia) and Zeta were both central and focal regions of the Medieval Serbian state. This is implied to have happened around the time of the Ascension Day in 1220 (May 29, 1220).

Ilarion was thus the first bishop and metropolitan of Zeta. One of the main pieces of evidence proving that Ilarion was the first bishop of Zeta can be seen from the charter of Archbishop Sava from 1233. He was also the bishop of Hum, seated at the Monastery of the Holy Mother of God in Ston (now Croatia).

"The first bishop of Zeta appointed by [Archbishop Sava] was, in all likelihood, Ilarion. There is very little information about him and his position. [...] The monastery of St. Nicholas on the peninsula of Vranjini is believed to have been founded by the first Bishop of Zeta, Ilarion. Donja Zeta, where this monastery was located, at the time of the relocation of the Metropolitanate, fell under the rule of the lord of Gornja Zeta, Stefan Crnojević." — A translated source on Ilarion's reign.

Ilarion resided for a time in the Monastery of St. Archangel on Prevlaka in the Bay of Kotor, and then in the Monastery of St. Anthony. Nicholas on Vranjina on Skadar Lake. In the catalogs, Ilarion is mentioned in the years 1219, 1220, 1233, 1241 and 1242.

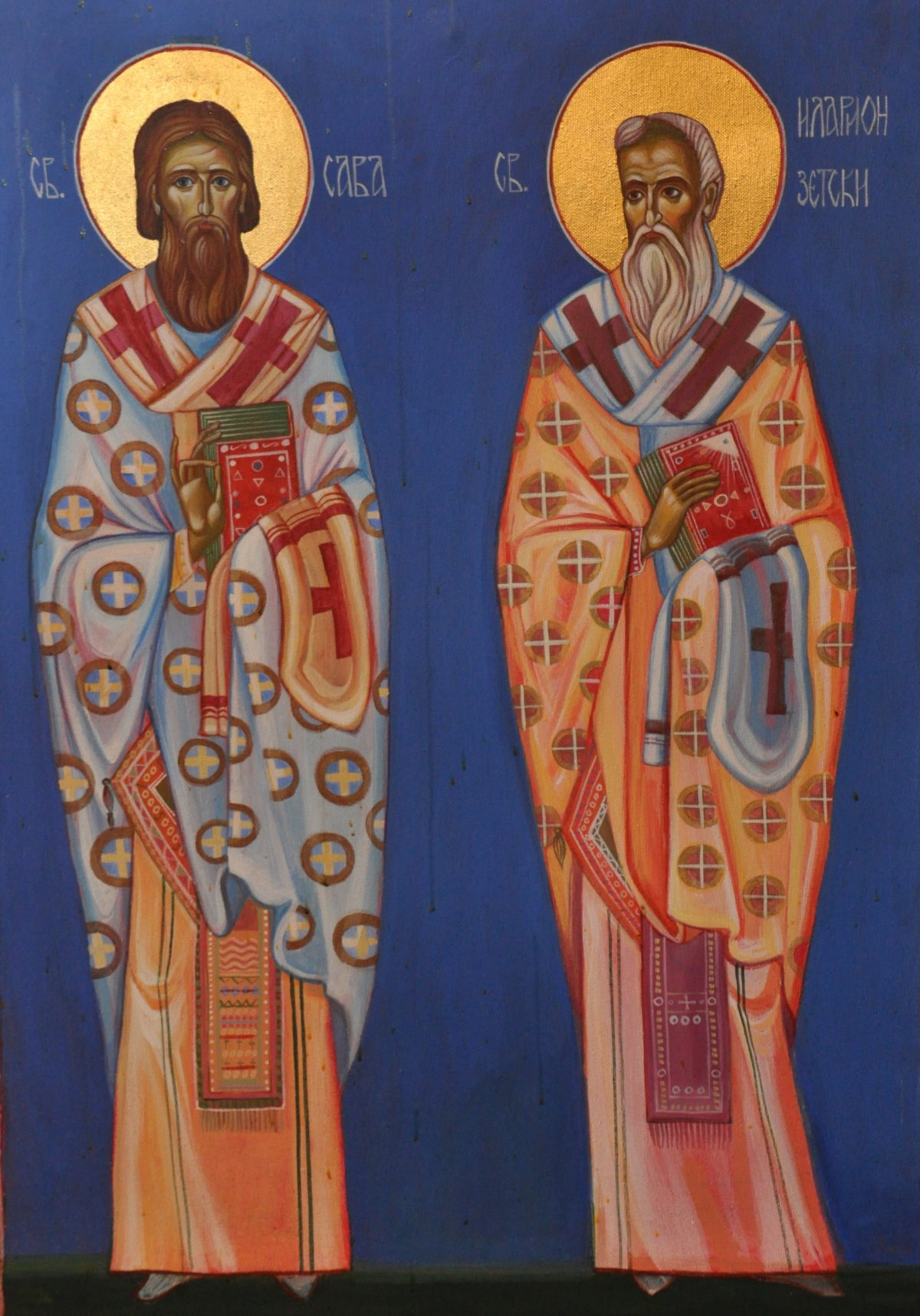
Devotional painting Saint Sava and Saint Ilarion.

The place of Ilarion's episcopal seat is inconclusive. Some sources state Ilarion's episcopal seat was in the monastery of St. Michael on Prevlaka near Tivat, in the monastery of St. Nicholas on the island of Vranjina in Skadar Lake or on the Isthmus of St. Archangel in Zlatica. Ilarion might also have initially sat in the Monastery of Drpe (St. Mark) in Podgorica, that is, in the Zlatica Monastery and that some time later the seat of the diocese was transferred to the Monastery of St. Mark. Archangel on Prevlaka.

The monastery of Vranjina was built with the blessing of Archbishop Sava at the beginning of the 13th century and was built by his disciple Ilarion, the first bishop of Zeta. According to the legend, St. Sava met Ilarion tending sheep with other village children, recognized him as a worthy disciple and took him with him to the monastery of Hilandar. Ilarion was there. From Hilandar he was sent to the then Zeta, where he was appointed the first bishop, with the seat on Miholjska Prevlaka. After his death, Ilarion was buried in the monastery of Vranjina.

Both Ilarion and his successor, German I, were thought to be seated in Boka in the monastery of St. Michael in Prevlaka.

Ilarion died in Vranjina, where he was buried in the aforementioned Vranjina monastery. He is buried on the left side of the narthex, against the wall. Archmandrite Nićifor Dučić wrote that Ilarion's tomb was raised one cubit above the floor. The monastery was destroyed by the Turks in 1843. On the side of that tomb was written: "From where the slave of the god Hilary is represented, the bishop of Zeta, the builder of the place of the world." In the same line was the year, but it could not be read. A note about this was made by Metropolitan Ilarion Roganović, who was a pupil with Abbot Isaiah in Vranjina. Pavel Rovinsky later found half of that plaque, which confirms the veracity of the Metropolitan's note.

== See also ==
- List of Metropolitans of Montenegro

== Notes ==
a. The nahiye (Ottoman Turkish: ناحیه) was an administrative territorial entity of the Ottoman Empire, smaller than a kaza. The term was adopted by the Principality of Serbia (1817–1833) and Principality of Montenegro (1852–1910), as nahija (Serbian Cyrillic: нахија). During the Ottoman Period, Old Montenegro was constituted of four nahijas: Katunska, Lješanska, Crmnička, and Riječka — the last one being the nahija where Ilarion comes from.

== Sources ==
- Mileusnić, Slobodan (2000). Sveti Srbi. Novi Sad: Prometej. ISBN 86-7639-478-4. OCLC 44601641.
- Džomić, Velibor V. (2006). Pravoslavlje u Crnoj Gori. Svetigora. ISBN 9788676600311.
