= Monastery of the Holy Mother of God, Ston =

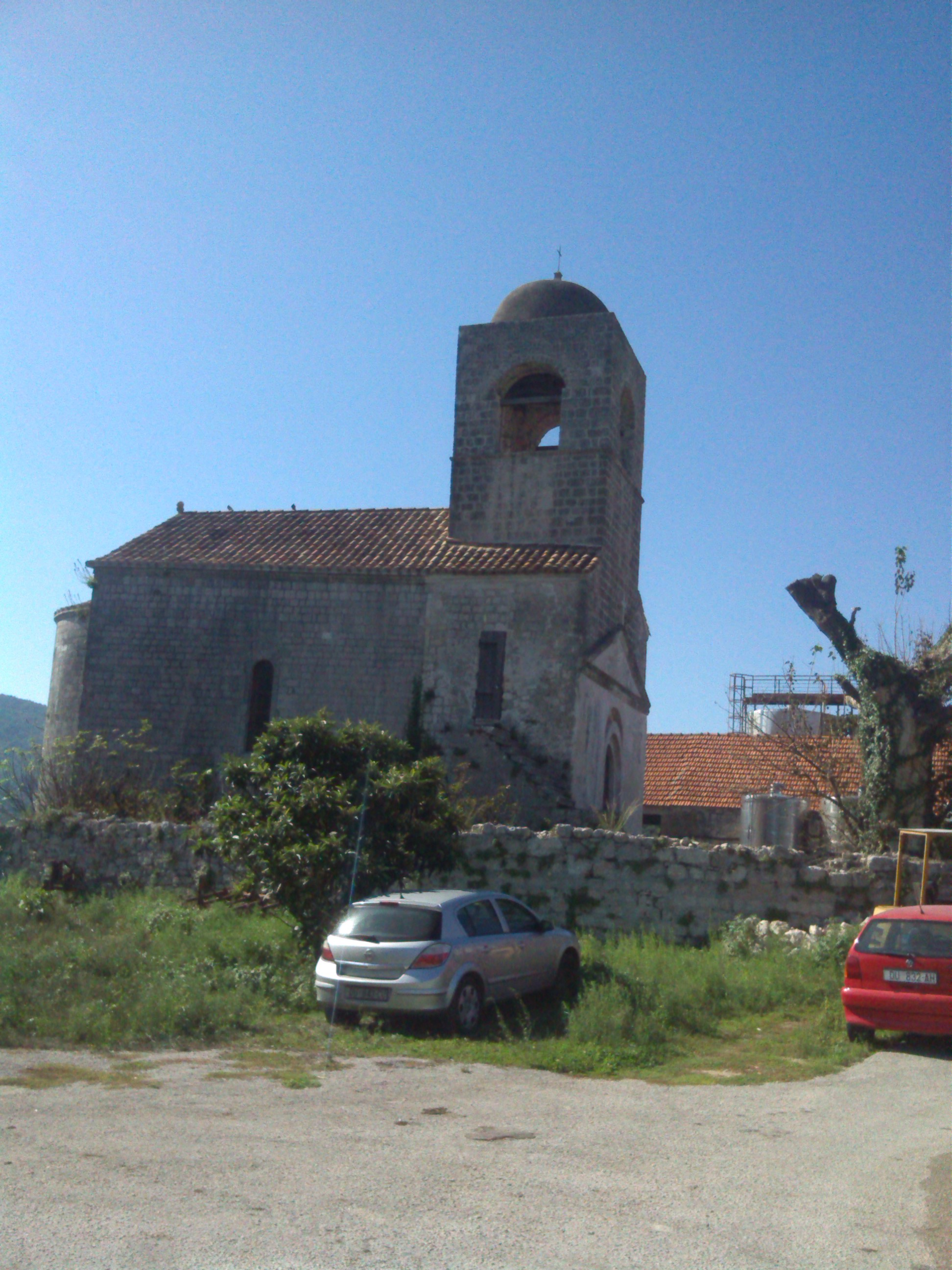

Monastery of the Holy Mother of God in Ston (Serbian Cyrillic: Манастир Свете Богородице Стонске) was a Serbian Orthodox monastery located in Ston (present-day Croatia). It was the seat of the Serbian Orthodox Eparchy of Hum between 1219 and the 1250s. The first bishop of the eparchy, seated at the monastery, was Ilarion. Following an earthquake in the 1250s, the episcopal seat was transferred to the Church of Peter and Paul on the Lim river. Serbian Orthodox priests continued to serve in Ston up to 1333, when the region was ceded by mutual agreement to the Republic of Ragusa by Serbian Emperor Stefan Dušan, under the condition of religious toleration, imposed upon the Republic.

== Bibliography ==
- Ćirković, Sima (2004). The Serbs. Malden: Blackwell Publishing. ISBN 9781405142915.
- Јанковић, Марија (1985). Епископије и митрополије Српске цркве у средњем веку (Bishoprics and Metropolitanates of Serbian Church in Middle Ages). Београд: Историјски институт САНУ.
- Popović, Svetlana (2002). "The Serbian Episcopal sees in the thirteenth century (Српска епископска седишта у XIII веку)". Старинар (51: 2001): 171–184.
- Вуковић, Сава (1996). Српски јерарси од деветог до двадесетог века (Serbian Hierarchs from the 9th to the 20th Century). Евро, Унирекс, Каленић.
