= Đurković =

Đurković (Serbian Cyrillic: Ђурковић, pronounced [dʑurkovitɕ]) is a surname of Serbo-Croatian language origin. Notable people with the surname include:

- Bojan Đurković (born 1989), Croatian sports shooter
- Božidar Đurković (born 1972), Serbian footballer
- Enis Đurković (born 1989), Slovenian footballer
- Ivan Đurković (born 1986), Montenegrin handballer
- Ljubinko Đurković (born 1962), Serbian politician and military officer
- Ljubomir Đurković (1952–2022), Montenegrin author and poet
- Miloš Đurković (born 1956), Bosnian Serb footballer and manager
- Nikola Đurković (born 1994), Montenegrin footballer
- Nikola Đurković (musician) (1812–1876), Serbian musician and theater artist
- Pavel Đurković (1772–1830), Serbian painter and iconographer
- Petar Đurković (1908–1981), Serbian astronomer
- Ratko Đurković (born 1975), Montenegrin handballer and coach
- Slaviša Đurković (1968–2025), Montenegrin footballer
- Svetlana Đurković (born 1974), Croatian-born Bosnian anthropologist and human rights activist
- Tatjana Đurković (born 1996), Montenegrin football defender
- Zorica Ðurković (born 1957), Yugoslav basketball player

== See also ==
- Đurkovići, village in the municipality of Podgorica, Montenegro
- Duraković, surname
- Đurak, surname
