= Vrhovac =

Vrhovac is a surname. Notable people with the surname include:

- Aleksandar Vrhovac (born 1972), Bosnia and Herzegovina footballer
- Maksimilijan Vrhovac (1752–1827), Croatian Roman Catholic bishop
- Vedran Vrhovac (born 1998), Bosnian professional footballer
- Vuk Vrhovac (1903–1952), Croatian diabetologist
