= Vulin =

Vulin (Serbian Cyrillic: Вулин) is a Croatian surname, a patronymic of the given name Vule, a diminutive of Vuk.

People with that name include:

- Aleksandar Vulin (born 1972), Serbian politician
- Dragan Vulin (born 1986), Croatian politician
- Lovre Vulin (born 1984), Croatian footballer

== See also ==
- Vulić
