= Rajčević =

Rajčević is a Serbian surname. Notable people with the surname include:

- Aleksander Rajčević (born 1986), Slovenian football defender
- Slobodan Rajčević (born 1985), Serbian futsal player
- Simonida Rajčević (born 1974), Serbian painter and artist
- Ana Rajcevic, Serbian fashion artist
- Milorad Rajčević (1890-1964), Serbian globetrotter and writer.

== See also ==
- Raičević, a surname
- Rajčevce, a settlement in Serbia
