= LGBTQ rights in Bosnia and Herzegovina =

- Location of Bosnia and Herzegovina (green) in Europe (dark grey) – [Legend]
- Legal status: Legal since 1858 when part of the Ottoman Empire, criminalized upon incorporation into the Austria-Hungary in 1878, made legal again in 2003
- Gender identity: Transgender people allowed to change gender; surgery is required
- Military: Gays, lesbians and bisexuals allowed to serve
- Discrimination protections: Sexual orientation, gender identity and intersex status protections (see below)

Family rights
- Recognition of relationships: No recognition of same-sex relationships
- Adoption: Not recognised

Lesbian, gay, bisexual, and transgender (LGBT) people in Bosnia and Herzegovina may face legal challenges not experienced by non-LGBTQ residents. Both male and female forms of same-sex sexual activity are legal in Bosnia and Herzegovina. However, households headed by same-sex couples are not eligible for the same legal protections available to opposite-sex couples.

Bosnia and Herzegovina is a secular country composed of mainly Muslims and Christians (Catholic and Orthodox). While officially secular, religion plays an important role in Bosnian society. As such, attitudes towards members of the LGBTQ community tend to be quite conservative. Some LGBTQ events, most notably the Queer Sarajevo Festival 2008, have ended in violence, when "a combination of football fans and religious extremists" stormed the festival while shouting death threats and religious phrases. According to a 2015 survey, 51% of LGBT Bosnians and Herzegovinians reported some form of discrimination directed against them, including verbal abuse, harassment, and physical violence.

Nevertheless, attitudes are changing. In 2016, the government of Bosnia and Herzegovina approved a comprehensive anti-discrimination law, banning discrimination on account of one's sexual orientation, gender identity and sex characteristics. More and more gay bars and venues have opened, especially in the capital city of Sarajevo. Bosnia and Herzegovina's desire to join the European Union has also played an important role in the Government's approach to LGBTQ rights. The association ILGA-Europe has ranked Bosnia and Herzegovina 22 out of the 49 countries in the Council of Europe in terms of LGBTQ rights legislation.

== Law regarding same-sex sexual activity ==
While parts of Western and Central Europe experienced what historians describe as "sodomy panics", marked by intense investigations and mass public executions, Ottoman-ruled regions like modern Bosnia, Albania and Greece avoided similar witch hunts against homosexuals.

Bosnia and Herzegovina is a federation consisting of two entities, namely the Federation of Bosnia and Herzegovina and the Republika Srpska. Same-sex sexual activity was legalized in the Federation of Bosnia and Herzegovina in 1996 and in the Republika Srpska in 1998, by those two entities adopting their own criminal laws. The Brčko District followed suit and legalized homosexuality in 2003, making it legal nationwide since then. The age of consent is equal and set at 14 years, regardless of gender and/or sexual orientation (having sexual relations with a person under 14 is considered statutory rape).

== Recognition of same-sex relationships ==
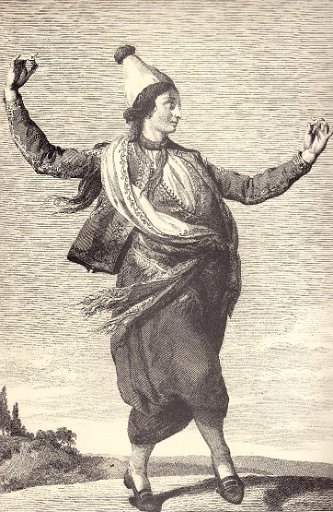
Bosnian Köçek (male effeminate dancer)

=== Ottoman Empire ===
In 1858, the Ottoman Empire legalized same-sex sexual intercourse.

=== Bosnia and Herzegovina ===
There is no legal recognition of same-sex couples on a national or subnational level. The Constitution of Bosnia and Herzegovina remains silent on gender eligibility for a marriage, and on a subnational scale, both entities, the Federation of Bosnia and Herzegovina and the Republika Srpska, limit marriage to opposite-sex couples, as prescribed by their respective family codes.

On 19 October 2018, the Federation of Bosnia and Herzegovina (FBiH) adopted a request for the legalisation of civil unions. "The said item was on the session agenda and it was adopted in the same form as it was proposed," FBiH Prime Minister Fadil Novalić said. The Government will now form a working group to analyse the proposal, which will need to be later adopted by the Parliament. The working group was established in January 2020 and was due to start working in April 2020, but the start was postponed due to the COVID-19 pandemic.

== Protections against discrimination ==
Article 12 of the Law on Equality of Sexes (Bosnian: Zakon o ravnopravnosti spolova), adopted in early 2003, prohibits discrimination based on gender and sexual orientation. Sexual orientation is not explicitly defined, however.

The labour law of the Federation of Bosnia and Herzegovina (FBiH) also explicitly prohibits discrimination based on sexual orientation, as does Brčko District's labour law.

The Law Against Discrimination (Bosnian: Zakon o zabrani diskriminacije) was adopted in 2009, prohibiting discrimination based on sex, gender expression and sexual orientation. Furthermore, the law forbids harassment and segregation on the basis of sexual orientation. Article 2 of the law states as follows:

Discrimination, in terms of this Law, shall be any different treatment including any exclusion, limitation or preference based on real or perceived grounds towards any person or group of persons, their relatives, or persons otherwise associated with them, on the grounds of their race, skin colour, language, religion, ethnic affiliation, disability, age, national or social background, connection to a national minority, political or other persuasion, property, membership in trade union or any other association, education, social status and sex, sexual orientation, gender identity, sexual characteristics, as well as any other circumstance serving the purpose of or resulting in prevention or restriction of any individual from enjoyment or realization, on equal footing, of rights and freedoms in all areas of life.

In July 2016, the Bosnian Parliament adopted a bill amending anti-discrimination laws to explicitly prohibit discrimination based on sexual orientation, gender identity and sex characteristics.

=== Hate crime laws ===
In April 2016, the Federation of Bosnia and Herzegovina approved amendments to its Criminal Code by outlawing hate crimes on the basis of sexual orientation and gender identity. The law was published in the official gazette on 15 June 2016. Similar bans already existed in Republika Srpska and the Brčko District.

== Gender identity and expression ==
Transgender people may change their legal gender in Bosnia and Herzegovina after having undergone sex reassignment surgery and other medical treatments.

== Activism ==
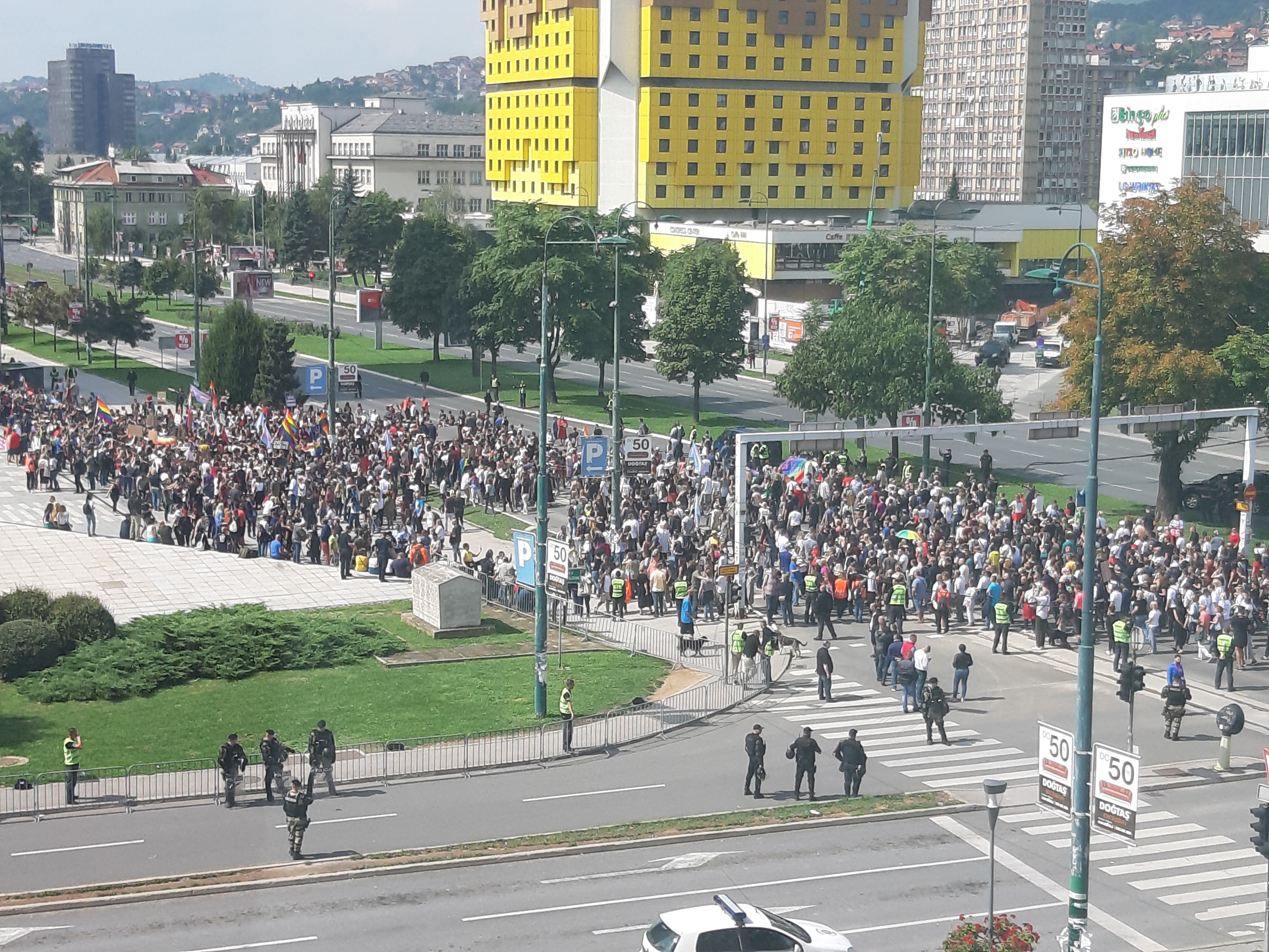
First Pride parade held in Sarajevo, September 2019.

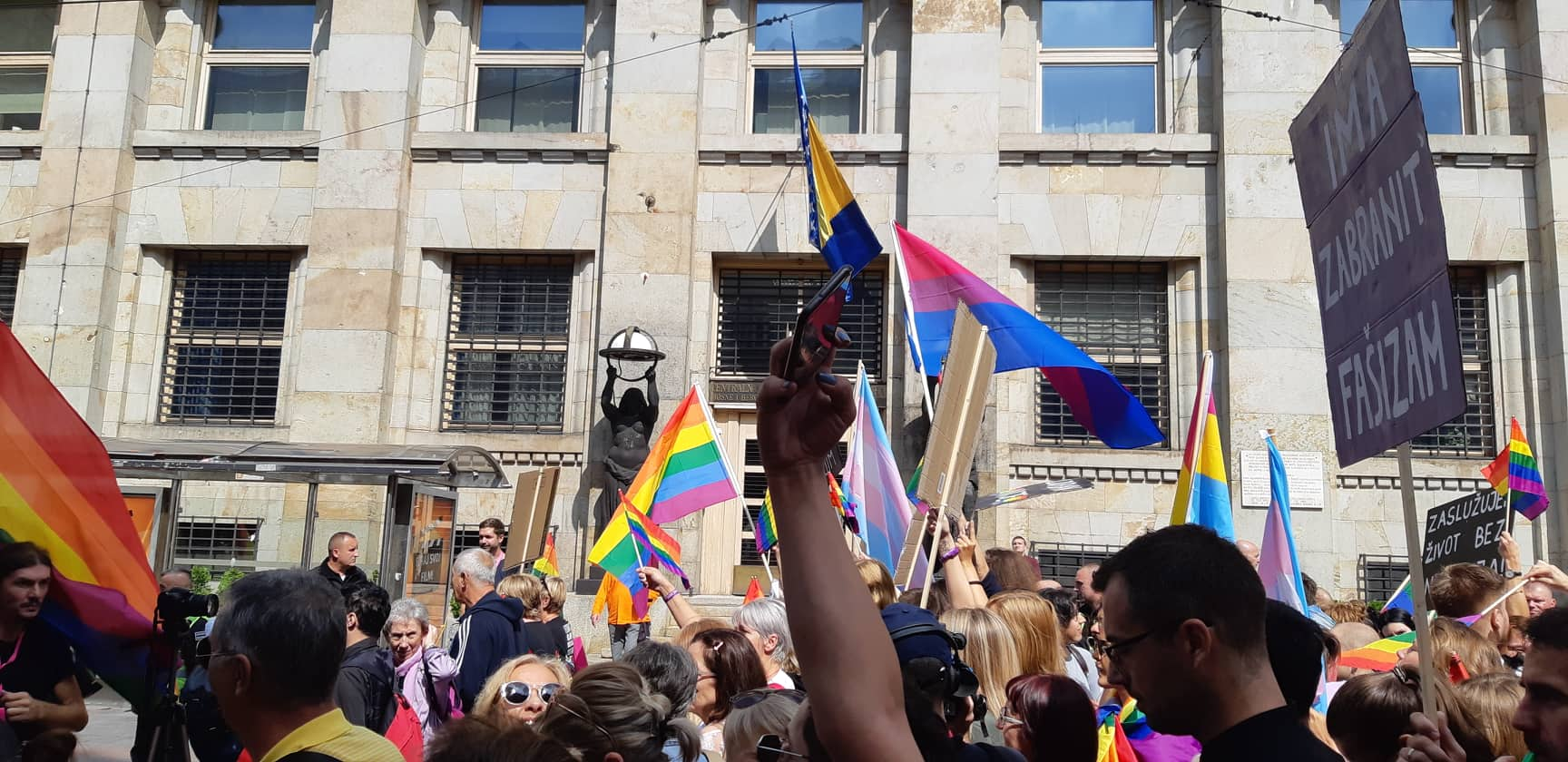
BIH Pride March, September 2019.

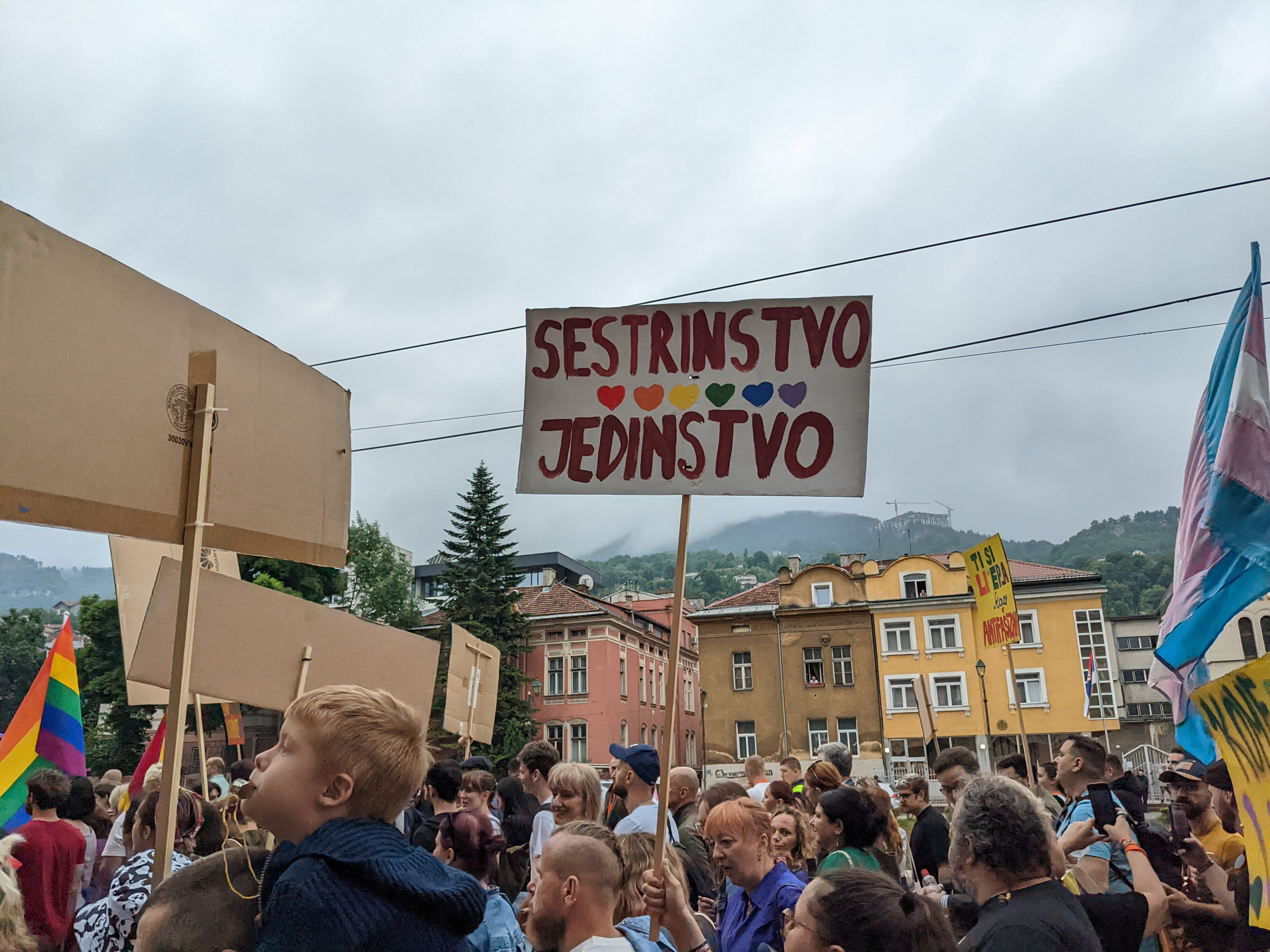
Gay pride in Sarajevo, 2023

Quite a few organizations have been working on LGBTQ rights in Bosnia and Herzegovina. Organisation Q (Udruženje Q) was the first LGBTQ organization to register in Bosnia and Herzegovina. Organization Q works for "the promotion and protection of culture, identities and human rights of queer persons", and was founded in September 2002. It formally registered in February 2004.

Logos was initially registered at the end of 2005 under the name of the Initiative for Visibility of Queer Muslims (IIVQM), but shortly after changed its name to Logos and re-registered in 2006. Equilibrium was registered in mid-2009 and was the first organization to work out of Banja Luka. Both organizations closed after two years.

Other organizations include Okvir and Simosyon (which both registered in 2011), Viktorija, the Sarajevo Open Centre (Sarajevski Otvoreni Centar), BUKA (Bosnian: Banjalučko Udruženje Kvir Aktivista, lit. 'Banja Luka Association of Queer Activists', which registered in 2013), LibertaMo Association (which began working in 2015), and the Mostar and the Tuzla open centers.

== Social conditions ==
Queer Sarajevo Festival 2008 started with approximately a dozen individuals attacked at the end of the first day on 24 September 2008. Eight people, one policeman included, were reported to have been injured after a large group of Wahhabi (Salafis) and other Islamists attacked visitors and the crowds. According to the organizers of the four-day event, police allowed a non-approved protest and anti-gay protestors to get too close to the venue, thus endangering the participants.

The festival, organised by Organization Q, opened in the Academy of Fine Arts in the centre of Sarajevo, the capital of Bosnia and Herzegovina. The attacks forced the organizers to make the rest of the festival a private event and to cancel it a couple of days later. Although Organization Q had organized public events before, this festival was the first cultural event of this kind in history of Sarajevo.

In 2014, the Constitutional Court ruled that the authorities had failed to protect the freedom of assembly of the 2008 festival participants.

On 1 February 2014, fourteen masked men stormed into the Merlinka Festival, shouting homophobic insults. Three participants were injured. Police arrived just after the attackers left, and were criticised for doing very little in finding and prosecuting the attackers. The festival continued the following day, with no incident, and with the full protection of the police force.

BIH Pride March, the country's first pride event was held on 9 September 2019 in the capital Sarajevo. An estimated 2,000 people marched in the first pride parade of Bosnia and Herzegovina, making the country the last former Yugoslav nation to hold a pride event.

In March 2023, activists at the offices of Transparency International, claimed that they were attacked by a group of men after a local event was banned by police. According to the activists, a few dozen men chased them through the streets. The attack came after LGBTQ film screenings and discussions were cancelled by police for security concerns and after Republika Srpska President, Milorad Dodik, called LGBTQ people harassers and stated that they should be prevented from gathering. Banja Luka's mayor, Draško Stanivuković, where the attack took place, stated that the LGBTQ community should stay in Sarajevo and away from smaller cities like Banja Luka.

== Public opinion ==
A 2015 survey found 48% of Bosnians would try to cure their child if they came out as gay. Another 16% stated that they would stop communicating with their child altogether. It also found 19% of Bosnia and Herzegovina's population supported granting same-sex couples some rights associated with marriage, such as economic and social rights.

According to a Pew Research poll published in 2017, 13% of respondents in Bosnia and Herzegovina supported same-sex marriage, with 84% opposed. It showed that 82% of Bosnians believed that homosexuality should not be accepted by society.

According to a poll published in 2019, before the first gay pride parade in Sarajevo, 24% of respondents supported the parade, with 72% against. 14% of respondents stated that they supported the legalisation of same-sex marriage, with 81% opposed. The poll was conducted in Sarajevo Canton, not covering the rest of the country.

According to a 2021 study, the first LGBT+ Pride parade in Sarajevo led to increased support for LGBT activism in Sarajevo. It did not however diffuse nationwide.

== Summary table ==
Same-sex sexual activity legal	Yes (Since 2003, nationwide)
Equal age of consent (14)	Yes (Since 2003, nationwide)
Anti-discrimination laws in employment only	Yes (Since 2003)
Anti-discrimination laws in the provision of goods and services	Yes (Since 2003)
Anti-discrimination laws in all other areas (incl. indirect discrimination, hate speech)	Yes (Since 2009)
Hate crimes laws include sexual orientation and gender identity	Yes (Since 2016, nationwide)
Same-sex marriages	No
Recognition of same-sex couples	No
Recognition of adoption for single people regardless of sexual orientation	Yes
Stepchild adoption by same-sex couples	No
Joint adoption by same-sex couples	No
Gays, lesbians and bisexuals allowed to serve openly in the military	Yes
Right to change legal gender	Yes
Access to IVF for lesbians	No
Commercial surrogacy for gay male couples	No
MSMs allowed to donate blood	Yes

== See also ==
- LGBT rights in Europe
- LGBT history in Yugoslavia
