= Duraku =

Duraku is an Albanian surname. Notable people with the surname include:

- Emin Duraku (1918–1942), Yugoslav partisan active during World War II
- Esat Duraku (1936–2021), Albanian chess master
- Fahredin Duraku (born 1966), Yugoslav footballer
- Izet Duraku, director of the National Centre of Cultural Property Inventory (NCCPI) in Albania

== See also ==
- Duraković
