= Kojic =

Kojic may refer to:

- Kojić, Serbian surname
- Kojic acid
