= Karadžić =

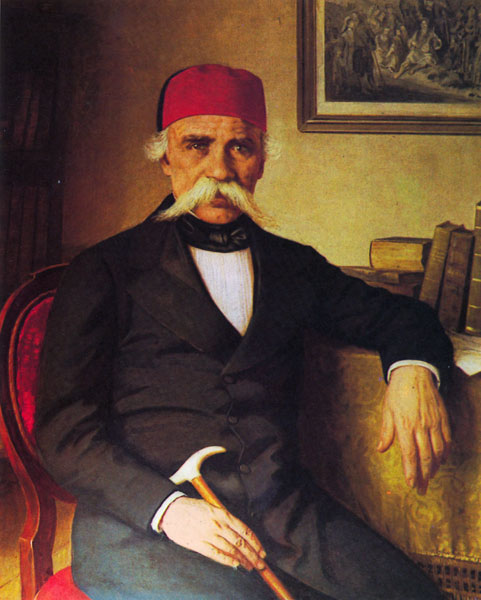
- Vuk Stefanović Karadžić (1787–1864), Serb linguist and a major reformer of the Serbian language
- Pronunciation: [kâradʒitɕ]
- Language: Serbo-Croatian

Origin
- Meaning: "black ox", "black animal"
- Region of origin: Drobnjaci

Other names
- Variant form: Karadža

Karadžić (Serbian Cyrillic: Караџић, pronounced [kâradʒitɕ]) is a Serbian surname, derived from karadža, a colloquial Serbian term for "black ox" or generally for "an animal with black fur or dark complexion", itself derived from Turkish karaca meaning "roe deer". The Karadžić family name was derived from a progenitor who was called karadža, a nickname found in Serbia since the second half of the 15th century ("Radica, son of Karadža", from the Branković defter). The surname is widespread over former Yugoslavia. It may refer to:

- Vuk Stefanović Karadžić (1787-1864), Serb linguist, major reformer of the Serbian language
- Milan Karadžić, Montenegrin director
- Milutin Karadžić (born 1955), Serbian and Montenegrin actor
- Radovan Karadžić (born 1945), former president of the self-proclaimed Serbian Republic of Bosnia and Herzegovina and a convicted war criminal
- Ljiljana Zelen Karadžić (born 1945), wife of Radovan Karadžić
- Šujo Karadžić, Montenegrin and Old-Herzegovinian uskok
- Tomislav Karadžić, Serbian football administrator
- Goran Karadžić, Serbian basketball player
- Vuk Karadžić (basketball), Serbian basketball player
- Stevan Karadžić, Serbian basketball coach and former player.

== Anthropology ==
=== Drobnjaci ===
The Karadžić brotherhood in Drobnjaci, according to tradition, ultimately descends from three brothers that lived prior to 1700 in Vasojevići, from where they migrated to Drobnjaci. Indeed, the ancestors of the Karadžići migrated from Lijeva Rijeka in Vasojevići in the mid-17th century. In 1930, there were 28 households of Karadžić in Petnjica, 3 in Malinsko, 3 in Gornja Bukovica, 5 in Pašina voda, and 19 in Palež. Anthropologist Andrija Luburić said that the Karadžić were "born with the gift of gusle playing". The Karadžić brotherhood in Drobnjaci has the slava (feast day) of Aranđelovdan (the slava of Vasojevići), while they have the prislava of Đurđevdan (the slava of Drobnjaci).

Vuk Stefanović Karadžić's grandfather Joksim migrated from Šavnik to Serbia.

The Divjanović family in the Jahorina region (in Bosnia) hailed from Drobnjaci and was previously surnamed Karadžić, according to epic poet and guslar Ilija Divjanović (1835–1893) whose poems were collected by Bogoljub Petranović.

=== Negotin Valley ===
Regarding the Negotin Valley, in the early 20th century, there was a Karadžić family in Sikole with the slava of Nikoljdan, and hailed from Montenegro. In Jasenica, there were two households of a Karadžić family which had the slava of Jovanjdan, and according to tradition descended from some "Ciganče" who had been brought by an ancestor of the Belobrečić in the 19th century.

== Sources ==
- Luburić, Andrija (1930). Дробнаци, племе у Херцеговини: порекло, прошлост и етничка улога у нашем народу. Штамп. Д. Грегорића. pp. 156–164.
- Niškanović, Miroslav (2004). Српска презимена: значење - распрострањеност - порекло породица. Српски генеалошки центар. pp. 126–128. ISBN 978-86-83679-16-4.
- Šimunović, Petar (1985). Naša prezimena. Nakladni zavod Matice hrvatske. p. 130. "Turska imenica koraca »srna« postaje u nas karadža »crni vol« i uopće »biće crne dlake ili crne puti«. Odatle prezimena KARADŽA i KARADŽIĆ"
