= Bojović =

Bojović (pronounced [bɔ̂ːjɔʋitɕ], Serbian Cyrillic: Бојовић) is a Serbian surname. It may refer to:

- Petar Bojović (1858–1945), Serbian general
- Milan Bojović (born 1987), Serbian football player
- Mijuško Bojović (born 1988), Montenegrin footballer
- Vidan Bojović (born 1979), Serbian futsal player who plays for Ekonomac Kragujevac and the Serbia national futsal team ...
- Zoran Bojović (born 1956), retired Montenegrin football midfielder
- Miljana Bojović (born 1987), Serbian female basketball player
- Miloš Bojović (born 1981), Serbian professional basketball player
- Miloš Bojović (1938–2001), Serbian professional basketball player
- Ivan Bojović (born 1977), retired Montenegrin football defender
- Dejan Bojović (born 1983), Serbian volleyball player
- Vlado Bojović (born 1952), former Yugoslav handball player
- Biljana Petrović née Bojović (born 1961), retired Yugoslavian high jumper
- Zoran Bojovic (architect), architect
- Bane Bojović, founding member of rapcore band Sunshine
- The Bojović brotherhood of the Vasojevići

== See also ==
- Bojić (surname)
