= Vulich =

Vulich may refer to:

- Anglicization of the Slavic surname Vulić
- A Hero of Our Time
