= Lijeva Rijeka =

Lijeva Rijeka Лијева Ријека
- Settlement
- Location within Montenegro
- Country: Montenegro
- Municipality: Podgorica

Population (2011)
  - Total: 36
- Time zone: UTC+1 (CET)
  - Summer (DST): UTC+2 (CEST)

Lijeva Rijeka (Montenegrin Cyrillic: Лијева Ријека, translation: Left River) is a settlement in the municipality of Podgorica, Montenegro.

It is perhaps best known as the paternal ancestral homeland of Slobodan Milošević.

== Geography ==
Lijeva Rijeka sits at an elevation of roughly 980 metres above sea level, at approximately 42°42′N 19°30′E. It is located around 50 kilometres from the centre of Podgorica, in the upper highland country between the lowland Zeta basin to the southwest and the Komovi mountains to the northeast.

The terrain is hilly and heavily forested, broken up by streams and narrow valleys, a landscape shared with the wider area of Upper Vasojevići. The village is surrounded by smaller hamlets and localities such as Lopate, and the area borders the historical tribal territories of the Bratonožići and Kuči to the south.

== History ==
=== Origins and the Vasojevići tribe ===
Although today a small and largely depopulated village, Lijeva Rijeka holds an outsized place in Montenegrin history. It is traditionally regarded as the cradle of the Vasojevići, the largest of Montenegro's historical highland tribes, and it is the paternal ancestral home of the former Yugoslav and Serbian president Slobodan Milošević.

Lijeva Rijeka is closely tied to the foundation legend of the Vasojevići tribe (pleme), one of the seven highland tribes of the Brda. According to oral tradition, the tribe takes its name from an ancestor named Vaso, who is said to have settled in Lijeva Rijeka in the mid 15th century after fleeing the Ottoman advance through the Balkans following the fall of the Serbian Despotate.

From this initial settlement, the descendants of Vaso are said to have expanded gradually to the northeast, into the valley of the Lim river (Polimlje) and the area around Andrijevica and Berane. Modern historians treat the legend cautiously, but the early tribal territory of the Vasojevići is generally placed in Lijeva Rijeka, formed roughly between the second half of the 15th century and the middle of the 16th century through the union of several local kinship groups. While the later unofficial centre of the tribe became Andrijevica, Lijeva Rijeka is consistently described as its point of origin.

The population that remained free of Ottoman control in the Lijeva Rijeka and Andrijevica area came to be known as the Upper Vasojevići (Upper Nahija), as distinct from the Lower Vasojevići around Berane, much of which remained under Ottoman rule until the Balkan Wars of the early 20th century.

=== Second World War ===
During the Second World War, Lijeva Rijeka was an early centre of Chetnik organisation in Montenegro. In late 1941 the officer Đorđije Lašić established one of the first Chetnik military formations in the area, including a unit known as the Battalion of Lijeva Rijeka. The surrounding highlands saw repeated activity connected to the wider uprising against the Axis occupation and the subsequent fighting between rival resistance movements.

=== Administration ===
Lijeva Rijeka was historically a separate small municipality and tribal district. Following later administrative reorganisations in Montenegro, the settlement and its surrounding area were incorporated into the territory of the Capital City of Podgorica, of which it now forms part.

== Demographics ==
According to the 2011 census conducted by the Statistical Office of Montenegro (MONSTAT), Lijeva Rijeka had a total population of 36, reflecting the long term depopulation typical of Montenegro's remote highland villages.

Ethnicity in 2011
Ethnicity	Number	Percentage
Serbs	27	75%
Montenegrins	8	22.2%
Total	36	100%

== Notable people ==
- Gavro Vuković, lawyer and Minister of Foreign Affairs of the Principality of Montenegro
- Savo Orović, colonel of the Royal Yugoslav Army and colonel general of the Yugoslav People's Army
