= Vukan =

- Gender: male
- Language: Serbian

Origin
- Origin: South Slavic
- Meaning: "wolf"

Other names
- Derived: Vuk

Vukan (Serbian Cyrillic: Вукан) is a Serbian male given name that may refer to:

- Vukan of Rascia, the Grand Prince of Serbia 1083 - 1112
- Stefan Vukan, nephew of Grand Prince Vukan
- Vukan Nemanjić, the King of Serbia 1202 - 1204
- Vukan Perović (b. 1952), Yugoslav footballer

== See also ==
- House of Vukanović, the Dynasty named after Grand Prince Vukan
- Vukan Gospels, a gospel book of Vukan Nemanjić
- Vuk (name) (English equivalent Wolf (name))
- Vukašin, Serbian given name
