= Vuk (name) =

- Pronunciation: [ʋûːk]
- Gender: male
- Language: Serbian, Croatian, Slovene, Montenegrin, Russian, Ukrainian

Origin
- Language: Slavic
- Meaning: "wolf"
- Region of origin: Slavic

Other names
- Related names: see list

Vuk (Serbian Cyrillic: Вук) is a male Slavic given name, predominantly recorded among Serbs as well as Bosnians, Croatians, Macedonians, Montenegrins, and Slovenes. The name is also found as a surname. In 2021, Vuk ranked as the third most popular boy's name in Serbia.

== Etymology and history ==
The name literally means "wolf". Vuk Karadžić, 19th-century Serbian philologist and ethnographer, explained the traditional, apotropaic use of the name: a woman who had lost several babies in succession would name her newborn son Vuk because it was believed that the witches, who "ate" the babies, were afraid to attack the wolves. In the Serbian epic poetry, the wolf is a symbol of fearlessness. Vuk was the 3rd most popular name for boys in Serbia in 2021.

There are many given names derived from the noun vuk. The following are male names recorded among the Serbs by the 19th century: Vukaj, Vuko, Vukoje, Vukovoj, Vukovoje, Vukal, Vukalj, Vukajlo, Vukola, Vukel, Vukelja, Vukula, Vukan, Vukolin, Vukota, Vukić, Vukadin, Vukac, Vukas, Vuksan, Vukač, Vukašin, Vukša, Vukdrag, Vukman, Vukoman, Vukmir, Vukomir, Vukmilj, Vukoslav, Vukosav, Dobrovuk, Vučo, Vučko, Vučela, Vučan, Vučen, Vučin, Vučihna, Vučina, Vučeta, Vučić, Vučkulin, Vujo, Vujan, Vujat, Vujadin, Vujin, Vujeta, Vujčeta, Vujčin, Vujić, Vujko, Vujak, Vujica, Vujača, Vujaš, Vule, Vulina, Vulić, Vulic, and Vuleš. There are also female names derived from vuk: Vuka, Vukana, Vujana, Vukava, Vučica, Vukadinka, Vujadinka, Vukmira, Vukomirka, Vukomanka, and Vukosava. All the derivatives from vuk were regarded as apotropaic names. In the period 2003–2005, Vukašin was the 30th and Vukan the 82nd most popular name for boys in Serbia.

The name Vuk is recorded in Serbian sources dating before 1400 in the form of Vlk (Old Cyrillic: Влъкъ), with a syllabic l. Through a sound change in Serbian that took place after 1400, the syllabic l turned into the vowel u. In this way Vlk became Vuk, and by the same process the initial Vuk- and Vuč- in the derivatives developed from Vlk- and Vlč-; e.g., Vukašin from Vlkašin. The names Vujo and Vule are the bases for the derivatives starting with Vuj- and Vul-. They are formed from vuk on the same pattern as the pet names Brajo and Brale are formed from brat "brother".

The given name Vlk and its derivatives,Vlkoš, Vlkoň, Vlček, and Vlčata or Vok for males, and Vlkava and Vlčenka for females, were recorded among the Czechs, while Wilkan was recorded among the Poles. Janusz, the Archbishop of Gniezno (1374–1382), was nicknamed Suchy Wilk or Suchowilk "dry wolf". Serbian surnames Belovuk and Bjelovuk mean "white wolf".

Closely related are the Bulgarian names Вълко (Vǔlko), Вълчо (Vǔlcho), Вълкан (Vǔlkan).

== Notable people with the given name ==
- Vuk Orle (fl. 1330), Serbian military commander
- Vuk Kosača (d. 1359), Bosnian military commander
- Vuk Kotromanić (died after 1374), Bosnian Ban
- Vuk Branković (1345–1398), Serbian nobleman
- Vuk Lazarević (d. 1410), Serbian royalty
- Vuk Grgurević (1440–1485), Serbian despot
- Vuk Krsto Frankopan (1578–1652), Croatian nobleman
- Vuk Mandušić (d. 1648), Morlach army commander in Dalmatia
- Vuk Isaković (fl. 1696–1759), Serb military commander in Austrian service
- Vuk Stefanović Karadžić (1787–1864), Serbian linguist and reformer of Serbian language
- Vuk Marinković (1807–1859), Serbian scholar
- Vuk Vrčević (1811–1882), Serbian writer and companion of Vuk Karadžić
- Vojvoda Vuk (1881–1916), Serbian military commander, real name Vojin Popović
- Vuk Vrhovac (1903–1952), Croatian diabetologist
- Vuk Kalaitović (1913–1948), Yugoslav military officer and Chetnik commander
- Vuk Kulenović (1946–2017), Bosnian-American composer and teacher
- Vuk Drašković (b. 1946), Serbian political leader
- Vuk Obradović (1947–2008), Serbian general and politician
- Vuk Ćosić (born 1966), Slovenian contemporary artist of Serbian origin
- Vuk Mandić (born 1975), Serbian-American astrophysicist
- Vuk Jeremić (b. 1975), former Serbian Minister of Foreign affairs
- Vuk Kostić (born 1979), Serbian actor
- Vuk Radivojević (born 1983), Serbian basketball player

== Notable people with the surname ==
- Goran Vuk (born 1987), Slovenian football player of Bosnian origin
- Gordan Vuk (born 1987), Croatian football player
- Matej Vuk (born 2000), Croatian football player
- Rudolf Vuk (1913–1962), Croatian sports shooter
- Slobodan Vuk (born 1989), Slovenian football player of Bosnian origin
