= Vuksan =

Vuksan (Serbian Cyrillic: Вуксан) is a Slavic masculine given name, derived from Slavic noun vuk, "wolf". It is a hypocoristic, possibly of the name Vukoslav.{{|pg|60}} It is attested in the Middle Ages, and Serbian epic poetry. It is also used as a surname. The patronymic surname Vuksanović is derived from the name. It may refer to:

== Given name ==
- Vuksan Bilanović, Serbian pop lyrics writer (Kraj i tačka)
- Vuksan (fl. 1477), Rovca knez and epic character (Vuksan od Rovaca)
- Vuksan Gela (or Gelja), legendary founder of the northern Albanian Gruda tribe
- Vuksan Lukovac (1939–1993) Yugoslav and Serbian film editor

== Surname ==
- Dušan Vuksan (1881–1944), Yugoslav historian and educator
- Pekisha Vuksan (1905–1941), participant in the Spanish Civil War and the National Liberation War and a national hero of Yugoslavia
- Radoje M. Vuksan (fl. 1898), Austro-Hungarian Serb educator and writer

== Notes ==
1. Such as in the 1477 register of the newly conquered lands of the Duchy of St. Sava, and 1485 defter in the Sanjak of Scutari.
