= Dušan Vuksan =

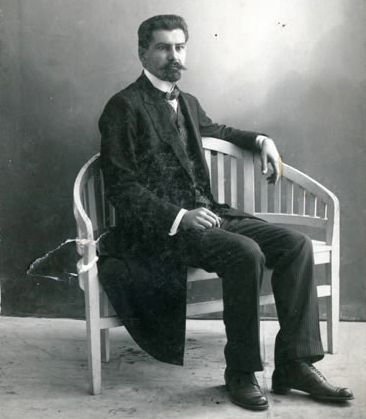

Dušan D. Vuksan (Serbian Cyrillic: Душан Д. Вуксан; 3 July 1881 – 24 December 1944) was a Serbian pedagogue, historian, editor and prominent representative of Montenegrin historiography in Yugoslavia during the interwar period.

== Biography ==
Dušan D. Vuksan was born in Medak, a small village in the Lika region, at the time in the Kingdom of Croatia-Slavonia. He studied classical philology and Slavic studies at the University of Zagreb. After graduation, Vuksan started a pedagogical career and gained first professional experience at a school in Bjelovar for a couple of years. He taught Latin and Serbo-Croatian language. In 1910, he was appointed professor at the gymnasium in Cetinje. Three years later, he was promoted to headmaster of the gymnasium in Peć.

After the end of World War I in the Balkans, he continued to work as headmaster of the gymnasium in Berane. In the early 1920s, he was appointed inspector of the Department for Education of the Zeta (Cetinje) Oblast. In 1926, he reached the height of his career when he was appointed director of the National Museum of Montenegro in Cetinje. After ten years of work at museum, he retired and moved to Belgrade, where he lived until his death.

Vuksan's scientific achievement was the systematic search, analysis, collection, compilation and publication of historical documents from many archives and libraries in Montenegro, Kosovo and Serbia. He was the editor of the scientific journal Zapisi from 1927 to 1941. Many of his articles have also been published in other periodicals of this time.

== Bibliography (selection) ==
- Spisak ktitora i priložnika manastira Cetinjskog (List of Founders and Donors of the Cetinje Monastery), Cetinje 1927
- Dolazak Sima Milutinovića u Crnu Goru (Arrival of Sima Milutinović in Montenegro), Cetinje 1931.
- Vjerovanje u vampire (The Belief in Vampires), Belgrade 1931.
- Pedeset godina Cetijnske gimnazije: 1880/81-1930/31 (Fifty Years of Cetinje's Gymnasium: 1880/81-1930/31), Cetinje 1932.
- Zapisi i natpisi Peći i Cetinja (Documents and Inscriptions of Peć and Cetinje), Skoplje 1935.
- Metropolit crnogorski Petar I i Atanasije Stojković, Belgrade 1935.
- Crnogorske finansije u XVII. i XIX. vijeku: 1723-1883 (Montenegrin Finances in the 18th and 19th Century: 1723-1883), Cetinje 1936.
- Petar I. Petrović Njegoš i njegovo doba (Petar I Petrović-Njegoš and His Times), Cetinje 1951.
