= Vukašin =

- Pronunciation: ʋukǎʃin
- Gender: Male
- Language: Serbian, Macedonian, Bulgarian, Croatian, Russian, Ukrainian, Slovene

Origin
- Origin: Vuk
- Meaning: Son of wolf
- Region of origin: Eastern Europe

Other names
- Nicknames: Vule, Vuko, Vuksa, Vuki
- Derived: Vuk (meaning wolf) and sin (meaning son)
- Related names: Vuk, Vukota, Vukan

Vukašin (Cyrillic: Вукашин) is an old Slavic name of Serbian origin. It is composed from two words: Vuk (wolf) and sin (son), so it means sin vuka (son of wolf). In some places in Croatia and Bosnia it can be found as a surname.

The name Vukašin can be found in Serbia, Montenegro, North Macedonia, Bulgaria, Republika Srpska and Croatia (used by Serbs of Croatia). During sound change phoneme S became š.

== Famous people ==
=== Nobility ===
- Vukašin Mrnjavčević, a medieval Serbian king.

=== Music ===
- Vukašin Brajić, a Bosnian Serb pop-rock singer.

=== Sport ===
- Vukašin Tomić, a Serbian football player.
- Vukašin Aleksić, a Serbian professional basketball player.
- Vukašin Dević, a Serbian football player.
- Vukašin Višnjevac, a Serbian footballer and football manager.
- Vukašin "Vule" Trivunović, a Serbian football player.
- Vukašin Poleksić, a Montenegrin football goalkeeper.
- Vukašin Petranović, former Yugoslav football player.

=== Other ===
- Vukašin Šoškoćanin, Serbian war commander
- Vukašin Mandrapa, Serbian Orthodox saint and martyr, one of the Martyrs of Jasenovac

== Places ==
- Vukašinovac, Serbian village near Aleksinac.

== See also ==
- Vukašinović
- Vuk (name)
- Vukota
- Vukan
