= Svetlana Đurković =

Croatian-born anthropologist and LGBT activist (born 1974)

- Born: 1974 (age 51–52); Zagreb, SR Croatia, SFR Yugoslavia
- Education: Longwood University; University of Chicago
- Known for: Co-founder of Organization Q

Svetlana Đurković (born in 1974), also spelled Svetlana Durkovic, is a Bosnian-American feminist, anthropologist and LGBTIQ human rights activist known as a co-founder of Organization Q, the first LGBTQIA organization in Bosnia and Herzegovina. She has worked to eradicate discrimination based on sexual orientation and gender identity in Bosnia and Herzegovina. As of 2018, she lives and works in Maryland, and Washington, D.C.

== Personal background ==
Đurkovic was born in Zagreb, SFR Yugoslavia, in 1974 and lived with her family in Sarajevo. Her mother, of Macedonian origin, and her father, of Montenegrin descent, were both refugees during World War II. Shortly before the Bosnian War broke out in 1991, Đurkovic was in the United States in Halifax County High School on a student exchange program living with a family of local attorneys. As the war progressed she could not return to Bosnia and Herzegovina, and she gained refugee status in America and graduated from Halifax County High School. On April 22, 1992, she lost contact with her family in Sarajevo during the siege of that city. Their next communication was 15 months later. Durkovic returned to Bosnia and Herzegovina in 2002.

== Education ==
Đurkovic completed her B.A. course with Honors in Anthropology, with a minor in Art History at Longwood University in May 1996 and her M.A. in Social Sciences at the University of Chicago in August 1998.

== Work ==
She worked for the American Sociological Association from 1998 to 2000 as a Governance Coordinator and as a Minority Affairs Program Assistant. Upon returning to Bosnia and Herzegovina in 2002, she and Istok Bratić started the first initiative one human rights for LGBTIQ persons in the country, The Bosnia 14 September. This was the first educational and information web portal for LGBTIQ persons in Bosnia and Hezegovina. In 2004, Đurkovic co-founded the first LGBTIQ Organization Q. She was an early public advocate for LGBTIQ human rights, appearing on national television, radio, and social media in Bosnia and Hezegovina from 2002 to 2009. Parallel to her experience in Organization Q, she has also worked in the UN Office of High Commissioner for Human Rights, UN Development Programme, and UNICEF. She also worked as a coordinator, facilitator and instructor in educational programs, training events and seminars related to gender, sex, identity, and human rights across Bosnia and Hezegovina and the Balkan region, as well as for the Women Studies Program Žarana Papić. Due to her work and visibility as LGBTIQ human rights defender, she has received death threats.

=== Organization Q ===
She is one of the founders of the first LGBTIQ organization in Bosnia and Hezegovina, Organization Q, registered in 2004. It was founded as a non-profit and non-governmental organization in Bosnia and Herzegovina dedicated to protection of human rights of LGBTIQ persons, as well as empowerment, development and public visibility of queer identity and culture, leading to the improvement of equality based on gender, sex, sexual orientation, sexual identity, gender identity and/or expression, and (inter)sexual characteristics. Durkovic was the president of Organization Q, and later, served as executive director. She has conducted research and co-authored publications and reports dealing with discrimination and social exclusion of the LGBTIQ population, namely in the areas of human rights, education, media, legislation, and health.

=== Queer Sarajevo Festival 2008 ===
Durkovic was one of the organizers and the public spokesperson for the Queer Sarajevo Festival 2008, the first of its kind in Bosnia and Herzegovina, held in September 2008. Before the festival opening, many publications, including the popular SAFF and Dnevni Avaz, used derogatory language, calling for the festival organizers to be lynched, stoned, doused with petrol, or expelled from the country. Death threats were also issued on the Internet against individual activists, including Durkovic. When the festival opened on September 24, 2008, at the Academy of Fine Arts in Sarajevo, a group of 70 religious extremists and hooligans attacked and injured eight people, including journalists and participants. The following day, a YouTube video appeared threatening the event organizers, showing digitally manipulated images of a beheaded Durkovic. The organizers terminated the festival the next day due to the reaction of the media, public, political, and religious representatives.

== Publications ==
- 1+1=0: Analysis of high-school textbooks about LGBTIQ issues in Bosnia and Herzegovina, (in BHS languages).
- With Jelena Poštić and Amir Hodžić, LGBTIQ Workbook: About sex, gender, sexual orientation and sexuality, (in BHS languages).
- With Alma Selimovic, About Sex, Gender and Sexual and Reproductive Health: SOS Kinderdorf Workshops, Italian Cooperation for Development in BiH, (in BHS languages).
- With Poštić and Hodžić, Creation of Sex? Gender?, (in English).
- With Poštić and Hodžić, Creation of Sex? Gender? Second edition in 2008 (in BHS languages).
- The Invisible Q? Human rights issues and concerns of LGBTIQ persons in Bosnia and Herzegovina, (in BHS languages) and 2008 (in English).
- With Slobodanka Dekić and Tamara Šmidling (eds.), Off to the side: Collection of works about Sexuality, (in BHS languages).
- "Evolving of Gender Norms and Perspectives in BiH: From Social to Individual"), in Na tragu novih politika: Kultura i obrazovanje u Bosni i Hercegovini, (in BHS languages).
- With Damir Banović, Rights and Freedoms of LGBTIQ Persons in Bosnia and Herzegovina: Analysis of Relevant Legal Acts, (in BHS languages).
- With Taida Horozović and Slobodanka Dekić, Analysis of terminology concerning LGBTIQ population in written media in Bosnia and Herzegovina, (in BHS languages).
- Main author, Zvornik Municipality, Republika Srpska, Bosnia and Herzegovina, Rights-based Municipal Assessment and Planning Project (RMAP), UNDP and UNOHCHR, Sarajevo, 2003.
