= Spasoje =

Spasoje (Cyrillic script: Спасоје) is a masculine given name of Slavic origin. It may refer to:

- Spasoje Bulajič (born 1975), Slovenian footballer
- Spasoje Samardžić (born 1941), Serbian footballer
- Spasoje Tuševljak (born 1952), Bosnian Serb economist and politician

== See also ==
- Spasojević
