= Vukašinović =

Vukašinović (Cyrillic script: Вукашиновић) is a Bosnian, Croat, Montenegrin and Serb surname derived from a masculine given name Vukašin. Notable people with the surname include:

- Darko Vukašinović (born 1985), Montenegrin footballer
- Marko Vukašinović (born 1993), Montenegrin volleyball player
- Milan Vukašinović (born 1982), Serbian footballer
- Milić Vukašinović (born 1950), Bosnian and Yugoslavian musician from Sarajevo
- Miloš Vukašinović, Serbian diplomat from Bosnia and Herzegovina
- Miroslav Vukašinović (born 1948), Serbian footballer and manager
- Sanja Vukašinović (born 1997), Serbian sports shooter
- Srdjan Vukašinović (born 1983), accordionist of Serbian-Swiss origin
- Theo Vukašinović (born 1996), English rugby union lock
