= Raičević =

Raičević is a Serbian and Montenegrin surname. It may refer to:

- Giovanni Raicevich (1881-1957), Italian martial artist
- Milena Raičević (born 1990), Montenegrin handball player
- Mirko Raičević (born 1982), Montenegrin footballer
- Milivoje Raičević, Serbian footballer
- Miroslav Raičević (born 1981), Serbian basketballer
- Nemanja Raičević (born 1976), Serbian short story writer
- Darko Raičević, Montenegrin runner
- Nikola Raičević, Montenegrin taekwondo
- Goran Raičević, Yugoslav track athlete, distance runner
- Slobodan Raičević, Yugoslav writer
- Vlado Raičević, Montenegrin politician
- Momčilo Raičević, former footballer
- Nebojša Raičević, former footballer
- Filip Raičević, (born 1993) Montenegrin footballer
- Budimir Raičević, RTCG director
- Tomica Raičević, Serbian politician

== See also ==
- Rajčević (disambiguation)
