= Queer Sarajevo Festival 2008 =

Public queer festival in Bosnia and Herzegovina

Queer Sarajevo Festival was the first public queer festival in Bosnia and Herzegovina, organized by Organization Q in September 2008 in Sarajevo. The festival is remembered as the first public coming out of LGBTQIA persons in the country.

The festival drew international media attention after participants and journalists were subjected to violent attacks from anti-gay counter protesters, fomented in part by homophobic rhetoric from politicians and media outlets. As a result, organizers ended the festival early, citing their inability to guarantee safety for the participants.

== About the Festival ==
Organization Q is the first organization for the promotion and protection of human rights of queer persons in Bosnia and Herzegovina. In September 2007 and in line with strategic plan of Organization Q, Organization Q and Sarajevo Open Centre jointly started planning the first Queer Sarajevo Festival dedicated to LGBTIQ community in Bosnia and Herzegovina. Couple of months after the preparations had started, Sarajevo Open Centre left the organizational committee, while Organization Q continued with preparatory work on the Festival.

Queer Sarajevo Festival 2008 was about sharing the personal stories of lesbian, gay, transgender, intersex and queer persons in Bosnia and Herzegovina and everyday accounts of love, friendship, social justice struggle, discrimination, freedom, pride and victory. The Festival in itself challenges and questions heteronormative and patriarchal values, particularly those centered around the issues of identity, gender, sexuality and human rights.

The goal of the Festival was to increase the visibility of queer culture, theory and movement and to establish the Festival as traditional event of visibility of LGBTIQ community in Bosnia and Herzegovina. Additionally, it was to open the public space for discussions related to queer issues in Bosnia and Herzegovina, LGBTIQ culture, identities and human rights. The opening night was to be on 24 September 2008 at the Academy of Fine Arts in Sarajevo and the Festival would run for five days. The program of the Festival consisted of exhibitions, performances, documentary movie screenings and round table discussions by participants from Bosnia and Herzegovina, the region and wider.

== Reactions ==
=== Threats prior to the Festival ===
Queer Sarajevo Festival was the first public LGBTIQ event that gained attention of the media, political leaders and general public of BiH. The organizers of Queer Sarajevo Festival were at the forefront receiving death threats during preliminary activities of the Festival. The organizers, including their supporters, media partners and journalists received death threats weeks before the opening. There were debates on the Festival and death threats online as well. Homophobic posters were widely distributed and put in prominent places across Sarajevo, calling for violence against the Festival participants and supporters, containing messages such as Death to faggots!. Similar posters were exhibited in other municipalities as well. Anti-Festival protests were announced at the Square of Alija Izetbegovic in Sarajevo, on 24 September 2008. Festival organizers had also received a threatening letter signed by the Union of war veterans of Sarajevo. Amnesty International had already called upon the authorities of BiH to ensure protection for Festival organizers and the Festival itself, on 18 September 2008. Organization Q documented all threats and handed over the material to the authorities, demanding the cases be processed.

=== Media coverage of the Festival ===
Staging Sarajevo Queer Festival during Ramadan month was used as an argument for different claims. It was said that such a festival was a direct attack on the religion of Islam, though it had been made clear that the Festival had no religious or anti-religious references and that it was a sole coincidence that the timing of the Festival overlaps with the month of Ramadan. Most notable print media using inflammatory rhetorics were Dnevni Avaz and SAFF. The cover page of the most read daily newspapers Dnevni Avaz, on 28 August 2008 featured a headline: "Who is trying to hoax Bosniaks with a gay gathering in Ramadan?" Some other headlines of Dnevni Avaz and SAFF were: "Gays in Sarajevo on Lejletu-l-kadr night!", "Dangerous fiddling with religious feelings of Bosniaks", "Homosexual Festival in holy Ramadan". Alongside the print media, a video was published on YouTube platform, portraying scenes of decapitation of one of the Festival organizers Svetlana Durkovic, positing a direct threat to organizers of Sarajevo Queer Festival. Calls for stoning, lynching and burning the Festival organizers and participants were published on online platforms.

=== Public reactions of political and religious leaders on the Festival ===
Among those who publicly propagated hatred against LGBTIQ persons were also the representatives of the official governing structured in BiH. Some of the politicians and religious leaders have made public statements that have contributed to spreading hatred and discrimination against LGBTIQ persons. Then Parliament member, Bakir Izetbegović has stated: I am not in the least pleased with the holding of the Queer Festival. This reminder of Sodom and Gomorrah on the day of the 27th night [of Ramadan], a noble night which Muslims look forward to – I am not at all pleased by that". Izetbegović also said around the time of the Festival that, "They [LGBT people] have a right to their sexual orientation, or rather disorientation, but we will employ all moral means to fight the influence of homosexuality on youth... It’s something that will spread if you let it. It should be done between four walls... The statement of mufti Seid Smajkic was that: "Freedom should not be used for promotion of that Western trash". The statement of Municipality council of Stranka za BiH (The Party for Bosnia and Herzegovina) was: "Ramadan ambient was violated by Queer festival, especially in its final and the most meaningful part of the month when every man, relying on the tradition and the significance of the holy month, will not exert a real reaction." Then member of the Federation of Bosnia and Herzegovina Parliament, Amila Alikadić-Husović deemed it inappropriate that "something like that" was being held in the month of Ramadan, adding, "[h]omosexuality is condemned by every religion. Who are we to approve of something that God forbids?"

== Attack on Festival participants ==
The opening night of the Festival was 24 September 2008, at the Academy of Fine Arts in Sarajevo with about 250 participants. Alongside police forces, Festival organizers hired a public security agency. On the day of the opening a group of about 70 wehabbis and hooligans gathered across Miljacka river bank on the street opposite of the Academy of Fine Arts and started shouting religious paroles and insults to Festival participants, such as: "Allahu Akbar! We will get you! Kill the faggots!". Police forces on site did not respond adequately and prevent that group in coming over to the entry point of the Festival premises. The attackers started throwing stones at the building of the Academy of Fine Arts and followed some of the participants upon their leaving the Festival. They followed them across the city of Sarajevo and physically assaulted them. Eight persons were injured that night: R.K., H.Ć., T.B., A.S., police officer Boban Vujičinović, journalists Peđa Kojović and Emir Imamović as well as a foreign citizen, Andrejs Viskochis.

After the attack, Queer Sarajevo Festival continued with its planned activities on another location but without public gatherings and promotion. Festival organizers continued receiving threats. On 25 September 2008 Dnevni Avaz published the names of injured persons, followed by Oslobođenje and Nezavisne novine. On the same day a YouTube video was published portraying decapitation and death treats targeting Svetlana Đurković as one of the Festival organizers. After the third night of the Festival, the organizers stopped all further activities.

Council of Europe, Amnesty International, embassies of France and USA have all issued press releases condemning the violence on Queer Sarajevo Festival. The Bosnian Presidency did not make any public statements on the threats targeting LGBTIQ population in relation to Queer Sarajevo Festival. However, Damir Arnaut, advisor on constitutional and legal affairs to the Bosniak member of the Presidency and then Chairman Haris Silajdžić, declared his public support to Organization Q, stating that: "Politicians are violating the Constitution of BiH with their homophobic statements."

Festival organizer and artist Alma Selimovic, whose work Metal exhibited at the festival, received political asylum from the United States in 2009.

=== Legal proceedings ===
In total 19 charges have been filed to Police Departments of Centar and Novo Sarajevo in the period between 4 September and 3 October 2008. According to the Official Gazette of BiH, in total three indictments have been made by the Prosecutor's Office. One indictee was sentenced to one year, while at the same time a ruling had been made that the sentence will enter into force if the indictee dos not commit another criminal offense in the following two years. Second indictee was acquitted of all charges, while the third indictee was sentenced to suspended 5-year jail sentence.

Organization Q appealed to Constitutional court of BiH on the bases that authorities in charge failed to ensure adequate measures for protection of their rights guaranteed by the Constitutional court of BiH and European Convention for protection of Human Rights and Fundamental Freedoms, as well as inefficient investigation, i.e. identification and sanctioning of perpetrators. According to the Official Gazette of BiH, disciplinary proceedings have been initiated against four police officers on 17 November 2008, due to reasonable doubt of a serious breach of official duties. Disciplinary committee found them responsible for the breach and sanctions were stated, while Police committee granted their appeals and freed them from responsibility.

Six years after the appeal was filed, the Constitutional Court of BiH on 25 September 2014, at the 88th plenary session, partially adopted the appeal of the Q Association for the Promotion and Protection of Culture, Identity and Human Rights of Queer persons:

The Constitutional Court concludes that there is a violation of the right to freedom of peaceful assembly referred to in Article II / 3.i) of the Constitution of Bosnia and Herzegovina and Article 11 of the European Convention where public authorities, in accordance with the positive obligation arising from this Article, have failed to take the necessary measures to ensure a peaceful gathering organized in accordance with the law, causing violence between the opposing sides and failing to provide a clear legal framework for preventing acts in preventing and deterring them from doing the same or similar acts.

— The Official Gazette of BiH

The Press Council in Bosnia and Herzegovina has received an appeal from Organization Q on 11 September 2008 related to the articles published in Dnevni avaz. The Complaints Commission of the Press Council of Bosnia and Herzegovina unanimously concluded that the newspaper Dnevni Avaz violated the Press Code based on the following articles: Article 1 – General Provisions, 3 – Incitement, 4 – Discrimination, 4a – Gender Equality and Respect of Individuality and 15 – Public Interest. The Appeals Commission of the Press Council in BiH has appealed to the editorial board of Dnevni avaz and other newspaper editions in BiH to take into account the democratic value of tolerance and coexistence in this geographical area and to contribute to raising the threshold of tolerance and mutual understanding, while respecting the professional provisions of the Press Code of BiH.

== Queer Sarajevo Festival 2008 documentary movie ==
In 2009, Organization Q produced a documentary movie Queer Sarajevo Festival 2008. The movie was part of film festivals in San Francisco, Beijing and Berlinale film festival. The movie was nominated for Best documentary/Essay film Teddy award.

== Queer Sarajevo festival 2009 — Festival as any other ==
Organization Q organized the second Queer Sarajevo Festival 2009 — Festival as any other. This festival had a different concept and was presented virtually from 24 to 28 September by placing 100 jumbo posters throughout Bosnia and Herzegovina, presentation of a video on online platforms and it also featured five-day media presence and messages on TV, radio and newspapers. As a result of QSF 2008, QSF in a box was promoted in spring 2009, a collection of 5 DVDs with the content from the first festival.
