= Vule =

Vule may refer to:

== People with the name ==
- Vule Avdalović, Serbian basketball coach
- Vule Ilić, Serbian military commander
- Vule Trivunović, Bosnian football manager

== Other uses ==
- Vule Airways, Ugandan private airline
