= Žujović =

Žujović (Cyrillic: Жујовић) is a South Slavic family name. Notable persons with that name include:

- Jovan Žujović (1856–1936), Serbian geologist and anthropologist
- Mladen Žujović (1895–1969), Yugoslav attorney, politician, and Chetnik commander
- Sreten Žujović (1899–1976), Yugoslavian soldier and politician
- Edmundo Pérez Zujovic (1912–1971), Chilean businessman and politician
