= Vulić =

Vulić is a surname from Croatia, Serbia, a patronymic derived from Vule, a diminutive of Vuk.

Notable people with the name include:

- Bojana Vulić (born 1984), Serbian basketball player
- Ivan Vulić (born 1956), Croatian architect
- Kazimir Vulić (born 1967), Croatian footballer
- Lejla Vulić (born 2002), Montenegrin-American singer
- Miloš Vulić (born 1996), Serbian footballer
- Zoran Vulić (born 1961), Croatian footballer and manager

== See also ==
- Vulin, surname
