= Simonida Rajčević =

Serbian artist (born 1974)

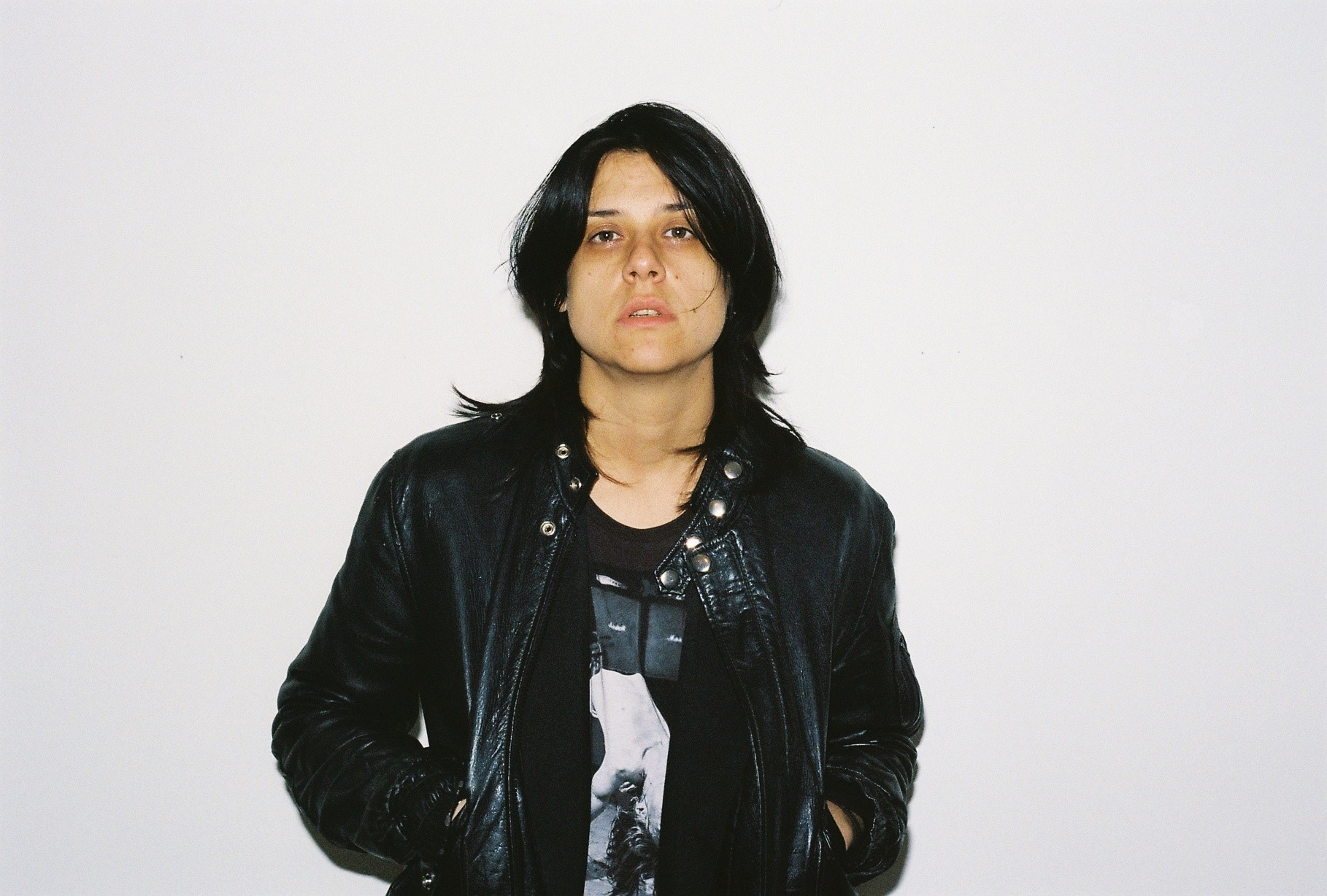
Simonida Rajčević

Simonida Rajčević (born April 2, 1974) is a Serbian painter and artist. She has had more than 20 individual and 50 group exhibitions.

== Life ==
Rajčević was born on April 2, 1974, in Belgrade, in what was then Yugoslavia. After finishing her primary and secondary education, she enrolled the Academy of Fine Arts in 1992 where she received her bachelor's degree in 1997. She won a DAAD (the German Academic Exchange Service) scholarship and attended post-graduate studies in Berlin, and received her master's degree at the same university in 1999. She became a member of Association of Visual Artists of Serbia (ULUS) in 1998. In 2000 she became an assistant to professor Čedomir Vasić at the Academy of Fine Arts, and has been working as an associate professor ever since. As of 2015, she received her doctoral degree which focused on intertextuality in contemporary art. Her work has been exhibited in Belgrade Zvono Gallery, Umetnički Paviljon "Cvijeta Zuzorić", Galerija ULUS-a, Salon of the Museum of Contemporary Art and Cultural Center of Belgrade, among other.

== Exhibitions ==
Rajčević's first solo exhibition was in 1995 at the Student Cultural Centre Gallery in Belgrade. It was an installation named "The last survivors from Nostromo". This giant construction of hanging metal plates was inspired by the creature from the movie Alien. Her next exhibition, "Express Old Masters Non-Stop", was in 1997 at the Zvono Gallery, which marked the beginning of their long-term collaboration. This is a first series of her large format paintings, also named 'plastic angels'. In 1998, she made a tribute to her year-and-a-half-long post-graduate studies in Germany, named "Berlin Mainstream". On these paintings she represented massive cranes as a symbol of the city of Berlin at that time – under construction, expanding and widening, rebuilding itself.

Her next series of works was made using combined techniques of digital print and acrylic on canvas. It is named "Truth for the truth" and consists of negatives of already ancient posters of rock and roll and pop icons such as Patti Smith, Nick Cave and Elvis Presley, assembled with Romanesque and Gothic architecture as the monuments of human persistence and effort, with images of stone carved archangel Michael, the judge and witness with scattered wings, and the statue of Jesus himself, bowing over the images of these modern gods of music and popular culture. These and many following paintings until today will feature an endless fascination with human body, which the artist has approached "...from so many different perspectives that range from religious to sexual and almost anatomically objective, but never overtly political or vulgar".

In 2007, Rajčević's created two monumental canvases, each ten meters long, named "The Snakewalls". By its structure and composition, one Snakewall is more linear in its narration, more gradual and analogue. The other one is fragmented, unpredictable, closer to digital language code. However, both are fiercely expressive and dramatic, both full of tension, characteristic for the matter that is about to break and explode.

Her 2010 exhibition, "Dark Star", took place at Zvono Gallery on April 5, 2010. American rock and punk star Patti Smith, who was staying in Belgrade at that time, also came to see Simonida's exhibition. In an interview with Rajčević, Zorica Kojić notes: "Assembled here are portraits of River Phoenix, Olivera Katarina, Dash Snow, Milena Marković, Patti Smith, Robert Mapplethorpe, Tracey Emin, Oleg Novković, Karl Marx, Gilles Deleuze, Sonja Vukićević, Courtney Love, and Sarah Kane. Also featured are quotes by Hole, Arthur Rimbaud, Lord Byron, the Streets, Patti Smith, Walt Whitman, Allen Ginsberg, Charles Bukowski, William Blake, Sinéad O'Connor, Bob Dylan, Lucinda Williams..." The sound piece for the exhibition was made by Manja Ristić and Ivan Kadelburg.

After the 2014 "Human Activities. Helpless." exhibition, which featured drawings on bed sheets and installed on mattress, the artist worked on several series which according to Zoey Frank "...explored a set of common contrasts, such as people and how they interact with their surroundings, nature vs society, man vs animals". These are "The Chain" (2014), "The First Cut" (2014) and "Strange Waves" (2016).

Most recent works are from 2020: "Fake Pain" and "Arrows". The former was exhibited at the Cultural Center of Belgrade and combines paintings with art historical and biblical references (El Greco, Caravaggio, Zurbarán) with a giant statue of Bruce Lee's arms. According to Jelena Petrović:

The sights of universal anguish, suffering, and pain of mankind, which intermittently fade and then resurface from the past in times of crises, conflicts, and wars, appear in the paintings by Simonida Rajčević as fragments, metonymic images and relationships through which a logical connection is established with the anguish of the modern man in global neo-colonial capitalism. The body of the homo economicus of today, which systemically produces itself, is moved by bright fluorescent colours, historical narratives of suffering, and its own vulnerability in the world in which it lives alienated. Paused at the moment of twitch, this dominant body of today becomes an aggressive means manipulated and controlled by pain. What has also originated from this universal coding of pain is the global society of today, which exploits, punishes, and dehumanises, and also consistently performs violence over everything that deviates from its perfect and uniform image of the world. In other words, the disintegrated structure of the wakening and reassembling body also speaks of the fact that our global civilisation has always been and still is Eurocentric, white, Christian, and patriarchal. Built and disciplined through repeated renewal of violence, this civilisation indicates to us the impossibility of eliminating what is a basic, social and politically structured human affect – pain.

The whole exhibition is available online through a 3D virtual tour.

In 2021 and 2022, her work was included in group exhibition "Among Women: Contemporary Art From Serbia" in Pittsburgh's 937 Gallery and New York's Bronx River Art Center.
