= Gavro Vuković =

Montenegrin politician (1852–1928)

Vojvoda Gavro Vuković
- Гавро Вуковић
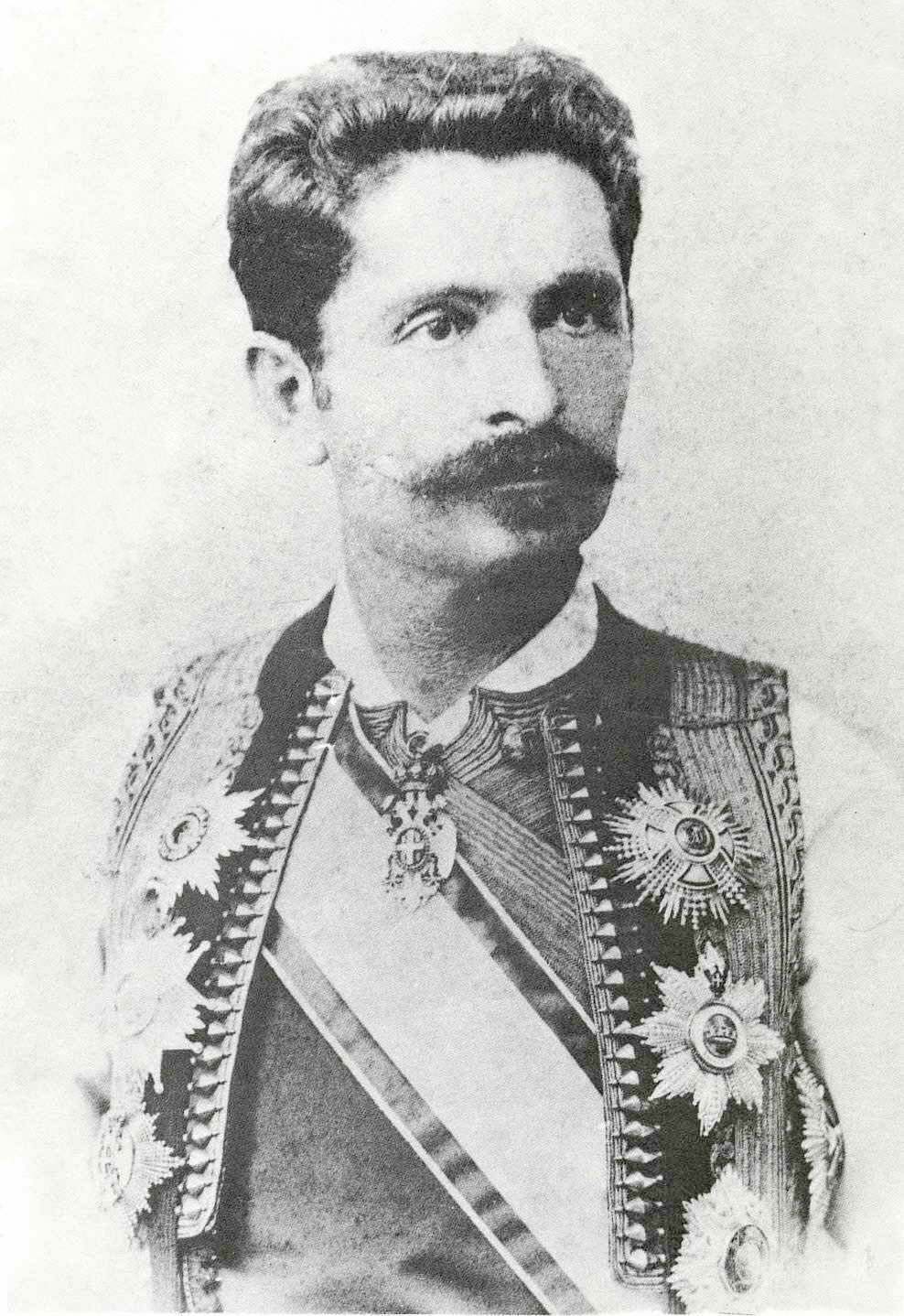

2nd Minister of Foreign Affairs of Principality of Montenegro
- In office 14 October 1889 – 19 December 1905
- Monarch: Nicholas I
- Prime Minister: Božo Petrović-Njegoš
- Preceded by: Stanko Radonjić
- Succeeded by: Lazar Mijušković

5th Minister of Education and Ecclesiastical Affairs of Principality of Montenegro
- In office 1 June 1903 – 19 December 1905
- Monarch: Nicholas I
- Prime Minister: Božo Petrović-Njegoš
- Preceded by: Simo Popović
- Succeeded by: Milo Dožić

Personal details
- Born: 1852 Lijeva Rijeka, Principality of Montenegro
- Died: 29 July 1928 (aged 75-76) Berane, Kingdom of Serbs, Croats and Slovenes
- Resting place: Djurdjevi Stupovi monastery
- Relations: Todor Vuković (brother)
- Parent: Miljan Vukov Vešović (father)
- Education: University of Belgrade Faculty of Law
- Occupation: Diplomat, politician, ambassador, jurist, commander and writer
- Nickname: Vojvoda Gavro

Military service
- Allegiance: Principality of Montenegro; Kingdom of Montenegro
- Rank: Vojvoda
- Battles/wars: Montenegrin–Ottoman War (1876–1878)

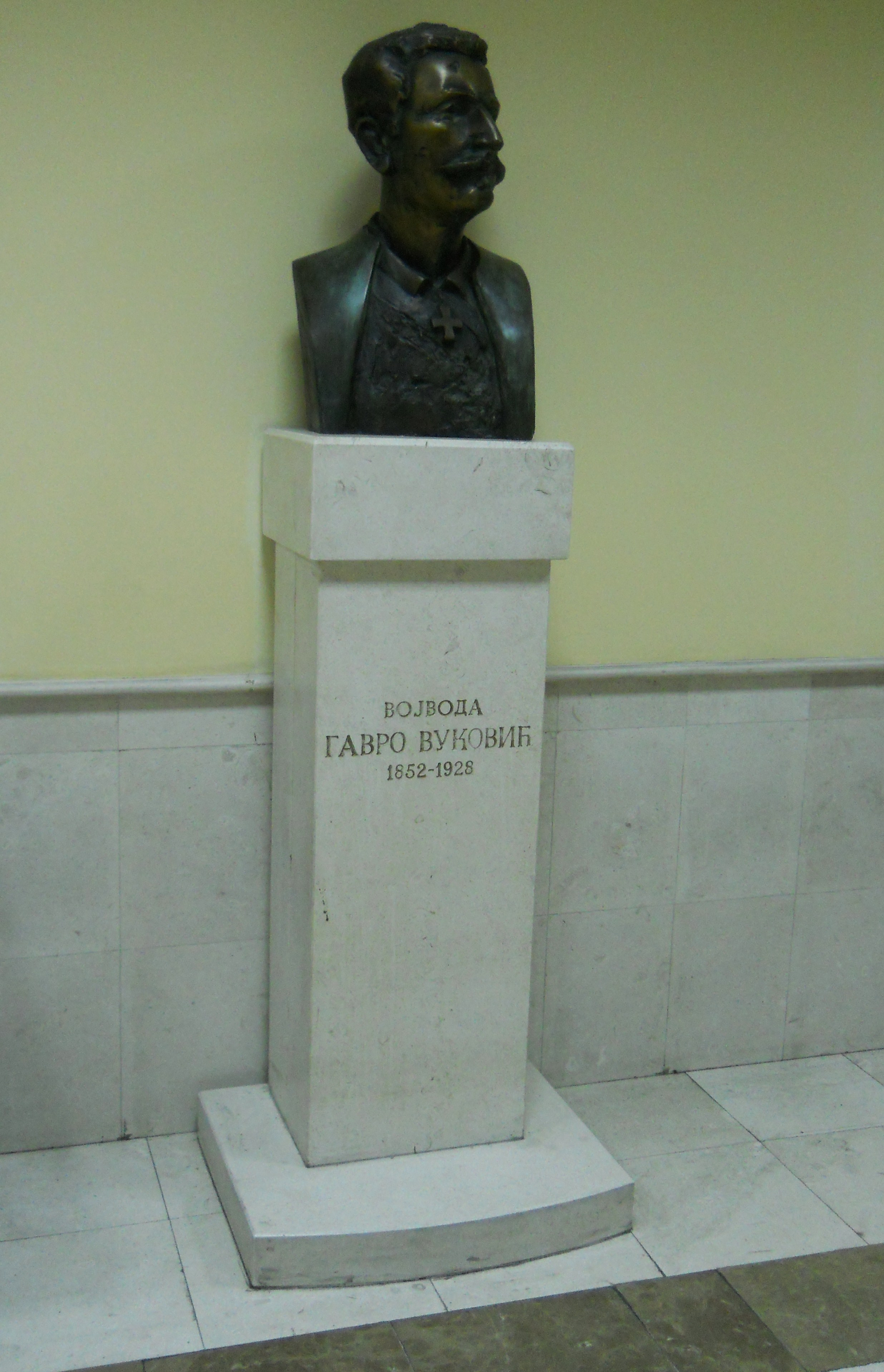
Bust of Gavro Vuković at the Faculty of Political Sciences in Podgorica

Gavro Vuković (Serbian Cyrillic: Гавро Вуковић; 1852, Lijeva Rijeka, Principality of Montenegro – 29 July 1928, Berane, Kingdom of SCS) also known as Vojvoda Gavro (Serbian Cyrillic: Војвода Гавро) was a jurist, senator of the Principality of Montenegro, a military commander, Yugoslav politician and writer.

== Biography ==
Gavro Vuković was the son of Montenegrin senator, hero, and chief Miljan Vukov Vešović of the Vasojević clan, a Serb tribe in northeastern Montenegro (at the time known as "Montenegro and the Hills"). He took his surname Vuković after his grandfather Vuko. His brother Todor (1853–1886) was a commander of the Upper Vasojevići-Lijeva Rijeka brigade.

He attended elementary school in the Serbian Orthodox monastery Đurđevi Stupovi (Berane), and in Cetinje. He attended high school in Nice and graduated in 1869 in Belgrade. He graduated from the University of Belgrade's Law School in 1873 and was the first Montenegrin to reach that degree of education. After returning to Montenegro, he took high positions in the government. He became the Secretary of Senate in 1874 and after that a member of the High Court. After participating in the Montenegrin-Ottoman War (1876-1878), he undertook high diplomatic missions concerning the aftermath of Berlin Congress and therefore was named Montenegrin ambassador in Istanbul, the capital of the Ottoman Empire (modern Turkey). Gavro became a minister of foreign affairs in the Principality of Montenegro in October 1899 and held that position until December 1905. From 1906 to 1908, he was the president of the National Senate and was twice elected as a deputy in Parliament, in 1906 and 1914. In the Kingdom of Serbs, Croats and Slovenes he was a member of the Montenegrin Federalist Party and again took the position of ambassador in Istanbul. He was buried next to the monastery Djurdjevi Stupovi, in the vicinity of Berane.

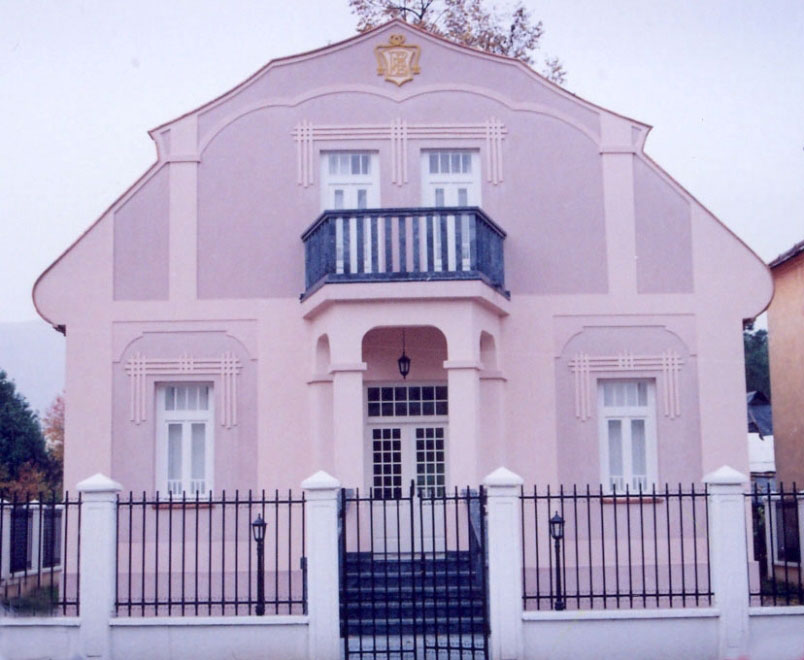
House of Gavro Vuković in Berane, today houses Montenegrin diplomatic summer school
