= Šarović =

- Language: Serbian

Šarović is a surname. Notable people with the surname include:

- Darko Šarović (born 1990), Serbian physician and athlete
- Mirko Šarović (born 1956), politician from Bosnia and Herzegovina
- Nemanja Šarović (born 1974), politician from Serbia
