= Cukic =

Cukic, Čukić (Serbian: Чукић), or Cukić, may refer to:

- Dejan Čukić (born 1966, Berane, Montenegro), Montenegrin-Danish actor
- Vladan Čukić (born 1980), Serbian footballer
- Bojan Čukić (born 1988, Belgrade), Serbian footballer
- Dejan Cukić (born 1959), Serbian rock musician, journalist and writer
