= Joksimović =

Joksimović or Joksimovic (Serbian: Јоксимовић) is a surname. Notable people with the name include:

- Dejan Joksimović, former Yugoslav/Serbian association footballer
- Igor Joksimovic (born 1980), Bosnian football striker
- Kristina Joksimović (died 2024), Serbian-Swiss model
- Jadranka Joksimović (born 1978), Serbian politician
- Milan Joksimović (born 1990), Serbian footballer
- Nebojša Joksimović (basketball) (born 1981), Slovenian basketball player
- Nebojša Joksimović (footballer) (born 1981), Serbian football player
- Obren Joksimović, Serbian politician
- Željko Joksimović (born 1972), one of the most popular singers and composers of Serbia
