= Spasojević =

Spasojević (Cyrillic script: Спасојевић) is a Serbian surname derived from a masculine given name Spasoje, and may refer to:

- Anja Spasojević (born 1983), Serbian professional volleyball player
- Bojan Spasojević (footballer, born 1980), Serbian football forward
- Bojan Spasojević (footballer, born 1992), Serbian football forward
- Dušan Spasojević, head of one of the largest Serbian criminal groups on record, the Zemun clan
- Ilija Spasojević (born 1987), Montenegrin-born Indonesian football forward
- Milan Spasojević (born 1950), Serbian triple jumper
- Neda Spasojević (1941–1981), actress
- Teofilo Spasojević (1909–1970), Serbian football player
- Toplica Spasojević (born 1956), formerly President of Red Star Belgrade
- Vladan Spasojević (born 1980), Serbian footballer
- Zoran Spasojević (born 1949), Serbian writer
