= Labović =

Labović (Serbian: Лабовић) is a surname. Notable people with the surname include:

- Dragan Labović (1987–2025), Serbian basketball player
- Đurica Labović (1930–2004), participant in the National Liberation War, lawyer, writer, journalist, and publicist
- Slavko Labović (born 1962), Serbian-Danish actor
