= Aleksandar Vrhovac =

Bosnian footballer

Personal information
- Full name: Aleksandar Vrhovac
- Date of birth: February 8, 1972 (age 54)
- Place of birth: Banja Luka, SFR Yugoslavia
- Height: 1.84 m (6 ft 1/2 in)
- Position: Midfielder

Youth career
- 1986–: FK Naprijed
- BSK Banja Luka

Senior career*
Years	Team	Apps	(Gls)
1989–1991	FK Naprijed		
1991–1994	Borac Banja Luka		
1994–1995	Radnički Bajmok		
1995–1998	Spartak Subotica		
1998	Csepel	10	(1)
1999	Videoton		
1999	BŠK Bardejov	19	(1)
1999–2000	Krylia Sovetov	8	(0)
2000	Krylia Sovetov B	6	(1)
2001	Kozara Gradiška		
2002	Wolfsberger AC		
2002–2003	Kozara Gradiška	30	(1)
2003–2007	Borac Banja Luka	24+	(0+)
- * Club domestic league appearances and goals

Aleksandar Vrhovac (Cyrillic: Александар Bpхoвaц; born February 8, 1972) is a Bosnian retired football player.

== Club career ==
During his career Aleksandar has played for many clubs in the second and third tiers in Central and Eastern Europe, FK Borac Banja Luka and FK Kozara in Bosnia, Spartak Subotica and Radnički Bajmok in Serbia, Csepel SC and Videoton FC in Hungary, BŠK Bardejov in Slovakia, FC Krylia Sovetov Samara in Russia and Wolfsberger AC in Austria.

Having started playing as an attacking midfielder, or even sometimes striker, with time he started playing more as defensive midfielder, becoming one of the best players on that position in Bosnian league by the end of his career.
