= David Đurak =

Croatian footballer

Personal information
- Date of birth: 9 March 2000 (age 26)
- Place of birth: Zagreb, Croatia
- Height: 1.81 m (5 ft 11 in)
- Position: Midfielder

Team information
- Current team: Krško

Youth career
- –2017: NK Zagreb
- 2017–2018: AIK
- 2019: Brommapojkarna

Senior career*
Years	Team	Apps	(Gls)
2020–2021	Međimurje	14	(1)
2021	Mura	5	(0)
2022-	Krško	10	(0)
- * Club domestic league appearances and goals as of 8 July 2022

David Đurak (born 9 March 2000) is a Croatian football midfielder who plays for Slovenian second tier-side Krško.
