= Duraković =

Duraković is a surname of Serbo-Croatian language. Notable people with the surname include:

- Asaf Duraković (1940–2020), Croatian doctor and poet
- Mehmet Duraković (born 1965), Australian football coach and former player
- Nijaz Duraković (1949–2012), Bosnian author, professor, and politician
- Reuf Duraković (born 1994), Austrian-born Bosnian football goalkeeper

== See also ==
- Đurković, surname
