= Vuksanović =

Vuksanović (Serbian Cyrillic: Вуксановић) is a predominantly Serbian surname, a patronymic derived from the given name Vuksan. It may refer to:

- Boško Vuksanović (1928–2011), Yugoslav water polo player
- Divna M. Vuksanović (born 1965), Serbian philosopher, writer, media theorist
- Draginja Vuksanović, Montenegrin politician and University professor
- Momčilo Vuksanović (Montenegrin politician) (born 1955), Serb NGO activist from Montenegro
- Oliver Vuksanović (born 1966), Macedonian lawyer
- Sanja Vuksanović (born 1967), Serbian chess player with title of Woman Grandmaster
- Slobodan Vuksanović (born 1965), Serbian writer and politician
- Sretko Vuksanović (born 1973), Bosnian retired footballer
- Vladimir Vuksanović (born 1978), Serbian basketball player
- Zoran Vuksanović (born 1972), Montenegrin retired footballer
- Žikica Vuksanović (born 1974), Slovenian retired footballer
