= Gordan Vuk =

Croatian footballer

Personal information
- Date of birth: 26 May 1987 (age 39)
- Place of birth: Varaždin, Croatia
- Positions: Midfielder; forward

Senior career*
Years	Team	Apps	(Gls)
2006-2011	Varteks Varaždin	72	(9)
2011	Međimurje		(1)
2011-2012	Karlovac	10	(0)
2012	Vllaznia Shkodër	9	(0)
2013	NK Čukovec '77		
2013-2014	NK Varaždin		
2014-2015	Nedelišće		

International career
2005	Croatia U19	7	(0)
2007	Croatia U20	1	(0)
- * Club domestic league appearances and goals

Gordan Vuk (born 26 May 1987 in Croatia) is a Croatian retired footballer who now works as a Commercialist at Mihha-Vision in his home country.

== Career ==
Vuk started his senior career with NK Varaždin, where he appeared in 72 games. While with Varaždin, he registered one of the highest ball striking speeds in the 1.HNL at 140 km/h. He also appeared in the 1.HNL for NK Karlovac. He was also linked with a move to Fredrikstad in Norway in 2008, but Varaždin doubled the transfer price after his trial.

In 2012, he signed for KF Vllaznia Shkodër in the Albanian Superliga, where he made fourteen appearances and scored zero goals. After that, he played for Croatian clubs NK Čukovec '77, NK Varaždin, and NK Nedelišće before retiring.

He also played several games for the Croatian national under-20 and under-19 sides.
