= Alma Selimović =

Queer human rights activist (b. 1981)

Alma Selimovic
- Born: 1981 (age 44–45); Rijeka, Croatia
- Education: Pennsylvania Academy of the Fine Arts
- Known for: Mixed media

Alma Selimovic (born 1981) is a queer artist and LGBTQIA+ human rights defender. She was one of the organizers of the first Queer Sarajevo Festival and is known for her mixed media art works which explore questions of body, gender and sexuality. Selimovic has exhibited her work in over 30 museums, galleries and other venues in Bosnia and Herzegovina, Germany and the United States. As of 2017, she lives and works in the US. Selimovic identifies as a lesbian and gender-queer person.

== Early years and education ==
Selimovic was born in Rijeka in Croatia in 1981, but grew up in Sarajevo, Bosnia and Herzegovina. When the war broke out in Bosnia and Herzegovina, Selimovic was 11 years old. During wartime, she was a dancer and dancing gave her strength to cope with living in besieged Sarajevo. She was raised by her grandparents and often watched her grandfather carve figurines out of wood to keep her entertained. She graduated in 2009 from the Academy of Fine Arts in Sarajevo and in 2015 she completed her MFA studies at the Pennsylvania Academy of the Fine Arts in Philadelphia.

== Career ==
=== Human rights work ===
Selimovic was a member of Organization Q, which was the first organization advocating to promote and protect the culture, identities, and human rights of queer persons in Bosnia and Herzegovina. The group organized the first Queer Sarajevo Festival in 2008 and faced a violent backlash. Selimovic's work Metal was being exhibited when the festival was attacked during its opening. Due to the death threats the organizers received and the physical attacks on the festival participants, Selimovic left for the US in 2009 where she was granted political asylum. Nine years later, in July 2017, Selimovic had an exhibition in Sarajevo, in which she presented eighteen fiber-glass works of gender non-conforming and trans* persons from Croatia, Serbia, Montenegro and Bosnia and Herzegovina. Also in 2017, she curated an exhibition Body language in Washington DC consisting of paintings, photographs and video installations by seven queer artists and activists from Bosnia and Herzegovina, Croatia and Serbia.

=== Artwork ===
Selimovic's art uses different media including fiberglass, plaster, metal, foam and hair. Her art explores the spaces between the non-binary gender language and individual expression of sex and gender. In her metal works she portrays androgynous figures. Winter Mendelsen describes her work:

Alma’s work in general derives from her fascination with people. After spending much time exploring the external human form, her interests began to shift to the internal and how a body is a container or a protective wall of everything we live, overcome, and sustain. It is amazing to see how our bodies can survive so much and hide within numerous stories of pain and suffering as well as happiness. And then, it keeps going and transforming further.

Selimovic's source of inspiration comes from her own background as said in her artist statement:

Idea of identities and life that occurs as a result of those is my starting point in every piece I make. As a foreigner and a new native, Bosnian, woman, lesbian, asylee, an LGBTIQ activist, and an artist, I have often had to feel dual nature of those identities. Sense of loss of home mixed with the world of opportunities, building a community mixed with isolation of individual.

Trying to move ahead, what I strive to reach is the humanness beyond these identities and communities, the true emotions and selves, albeit lodged among those multiple identities. As such, I am interested in the aliveness that is no longer based on typical acceptance and validation nor impacted by rejection and exclusion. It just is what it is, influenced by circumstance while now standing beyond them. There is still life, rawness, and unimaginable depth and beauty to enjoy and learn from.

My work contains elements of bodies and movements, as well as fragments of domesticity. Those are ever-present, like a road map of sorts, exploring potential impact of context on people's perception of objects and ideas. Sometimes these fragments represent a sense of familiarity, history even, but sometimes they resemble otherness.

== Awards and recognition ==
In 2015, Selimovic received the Fine Arts Venture Fund Award by Pennsylvania Academy of the Fine Arts. In 2014, she received the Justine Cretella Memorial Scholarships for the Outstanding Achievement by the Pennsylvania Academy of the Fine Arts. In 2013 and 2014, she received a Merit Award and Scholarship from the Pennsylvania Academy of the Fine Arts.
