= Nemanja Raičević =

Serbian writer (born 1976)

Nemanja Raičević (born 1976 in Novi Sad, Yugoslavia) is a Serbian writer of short stories.

His first book Priče (Stories) won the national Matica Srpska Award Prva knjiga (First Book) in 2002. The book was published by one of the most renowned and oldest national cultural institutions, the Matica srpska of Novi Sad. The volume is held in many libraries across the former Yugoslavia and beyond (e.g. University of Harvard). Priče was also short-listed for the most prestigious national award for short prose fiction, named after Ivo Andrić, a Nobel Prize winner for literature - Andrićevu nagradu (Andrić's Award).

His second book Nije kasno smejati se (It's Never Too Late to Laugh) was published ahead of the 2009 Belgrade Book Fair by Prometej publishing house from Novi Sad. The stories from Nije kasno smejati se are thematically and formally varied, yet all marked by Raičević's hallmark humour, and herald a unique voice in contemporary Serbian prose. While set in a deliberately imprecise time and place, Raičević’s stories, ripe with potent and memorable images, bespeak the troubled past, transitory present and uncertain future of the Balkans in a manner which is never referential or allegorical, but instead achieves a high degree of universal symbolism. The renowned Serbian literature critic, Marko Nedić, published an essay about Raičević's stories in the oldest Serbian literature magazine Letopis Matice srpske Raičević's stories and poems have also been published in numerous literary magazines (fuller bibliography on Cobiss-Opac Srbija), and have been translated into Hungarian and Romanian, as part of an international literature project for Middle Europe 3forcyberfiction (Referat, from Priče). In his second book of stories Nije kasno smejati se, one story has been translated into English.

In 2011, Raičević submitted his unpublished story Poklon ("Gift") to the literary competition organised by Mirjana Bobić-Mojsilović popular Serbian writer and public figure. The story was selected by the editor and published as part of the collective volume Antidepresiv ("Antidepressant"), launched at the 2011 Belgrade Book Fair. In early 2012, Raičević's short story Prolaznici na kiši ("Passers-by in the Rain") was included in the anthology Plejlista sa početka veka ("A Playlist from the Beginning of the Century"), edited by writers Ivan Antić and Slavoljub Marković, which appeared as a special issue of the review Priča, časopis za priče i priče o pričama. The selection featured short prose by young Serbian authors born after 1975. In June 2012 Raičević's previously unpublished story "Peto godisnje doba" ("The Fifth Season") was included in the collection of short stories Prostor za mokrog psa [A Space for a Wet Dog] published by the Kulturni centar Grad from Belgrade. The volume features a selection of stories chosen through an open international competition. A revised version of Raičević's story "Zeleni pogled" ("The Green Gaze") - originally published in Nije kasno smejati se - was included in the anthology of Serbian short story Pucanja, izbor iz mlade srpske proze, edited and with an introduction by Vladimir Vukomanović. The volume, published by Sluzbeni glasnik ahead of the 2012 Belgrade book fair, showcases the foremost young Serbian authors of short stories: Raičević features amongst the only two authors born before 1980 which were included in the selection. In 2013, Raičević submitted a "mini-story" "Noćnim vozom za Budimpeštu" as an entry for the "Milovan Vidaković" international literary competition, organized annually by the "Nedeljne srpske novine" ["Serbian Weekly"] magazine, published in Budapest, Hungary. The story was short-listed and publicly commended by the jury. It appeared in the issue of "Nedeljne srpske novine" of 27 February 2014 under the pseudonym 'Robert Jordan' that Raičević used during the anonymous submission.

Raičević's third book Na Proputovanju (the title can be translated as Travelling with reference to the inscription that the character from Truman Capote's novella Breakfast at Tiffany's, Miss Holly Golighthly, puts on her calling card) won the review Priča's award for the best unpublished collection of short stories in October 2014. It was subsequently published as a special issue of the review (no. 26-27b, backdated March–June 2014).Na Proputovanju is made up of substantially revised versions of stories and mini-stories published in 2011-2014 period (including "Poklon", "Noćnim vozom za Budimpeštu" and "Peto godišnje doba") and a number of previously unpublished texts. The strong unity of the book is achieved through an intricate web of recurring motives, images, place-names, literary reference and common themes, as well as through the use of recurring characters, a technique employed in Raičević's previous volumes. Through the central theme of 'travel', Raičević questions the often blurred line that separates reality and cyberreality; the ambivalence is achieved through an artful manipulation of deixis, whereby "here" often stands for "there", "then" for "now", and vice versa. In his review of the volume, the eminent critic and Emeritus professor of the University of Novi Sad Slavko Gordić interprets what he sees as a "travelling" approach to life as a mark of an essentially uprooted generation, while praising the lyrical and expressive qualities of Raičević's prose. In 2017, one of the stories from this collection, "Čežnja", was included in the anthology of "Shortest stories by Serbian writers" ("Nakraće priče srpskih pisaca", Belgrade: Gramatik) selected and edited by Slavoljub Marković.

In 2017, Raičević submitted the previously unpublished short story "Sitnina" ("Small change") to the third regional short story competition "Biber" organized by the Centre for Non-Violent action, CNA around the theme of reconciliation. The story was short-listed, translated into Albanian ("Imtësira") and Macedonian ("Ситнеж") and appeared in the 2018 thematic issue of "Biber"

Nemanja Raičević is a graduate of the University of Novi Sad, and presently lives and works in that town. He has also lived in Lisbon, Portugal.
