= Ljubomir Đurković =

Montenegrin poet (1952–2022)

Ljubomir Đurković (13 November 1952 – 29 November 2022) was a Montenegrin author and poet.

== Education ==
Đurković was born in Cetinje, Montenegro. He graduated with a degree in comparative literature and theatrology from the Faculty of Philosophy, University of Sarajevo.

== Career ==
Đurković worked as a playwright at the Montenegrin National Theatre and was a director of the Royal Theatre Zetski dom in Cetinje. During the 1990s conflict in former Yugoslavia he lived in the Netherlands as a political asylum seeker. He is the author of the plays The Family History Writer, Petronius or Methuselahs Enjoy the Eternal Spring, The Fifth Act, Tobelia, Refuse, New Outfit, Cassandra.Clichés, The Tiresias's Lie, Chiara Zorzi, and Medea. He published four collections of poetry: Polyphemus' Tears, Works and days, Still Something Changes, and Selected Poems in Slovene. His plays have been produced and/or published in English, Turkish, Bulgarian, Macedonian, Albanian, Slovenian and French. He was the winner of the most prestigious state recognition, the 13 July Award.
