= Vlado Bojović =

Yugoslav handball player

Vlado Bojović (born 10 June 1952) is a former handball player who competed for Yugoslavia in the 1976 Summer Olympics.

He was born in Celje.

In 1976 he was part of the Yugoslav team which finished fifth in the Olympic tournament. He played four matches and scored two goals.
