= Srdjan Vukašinović =

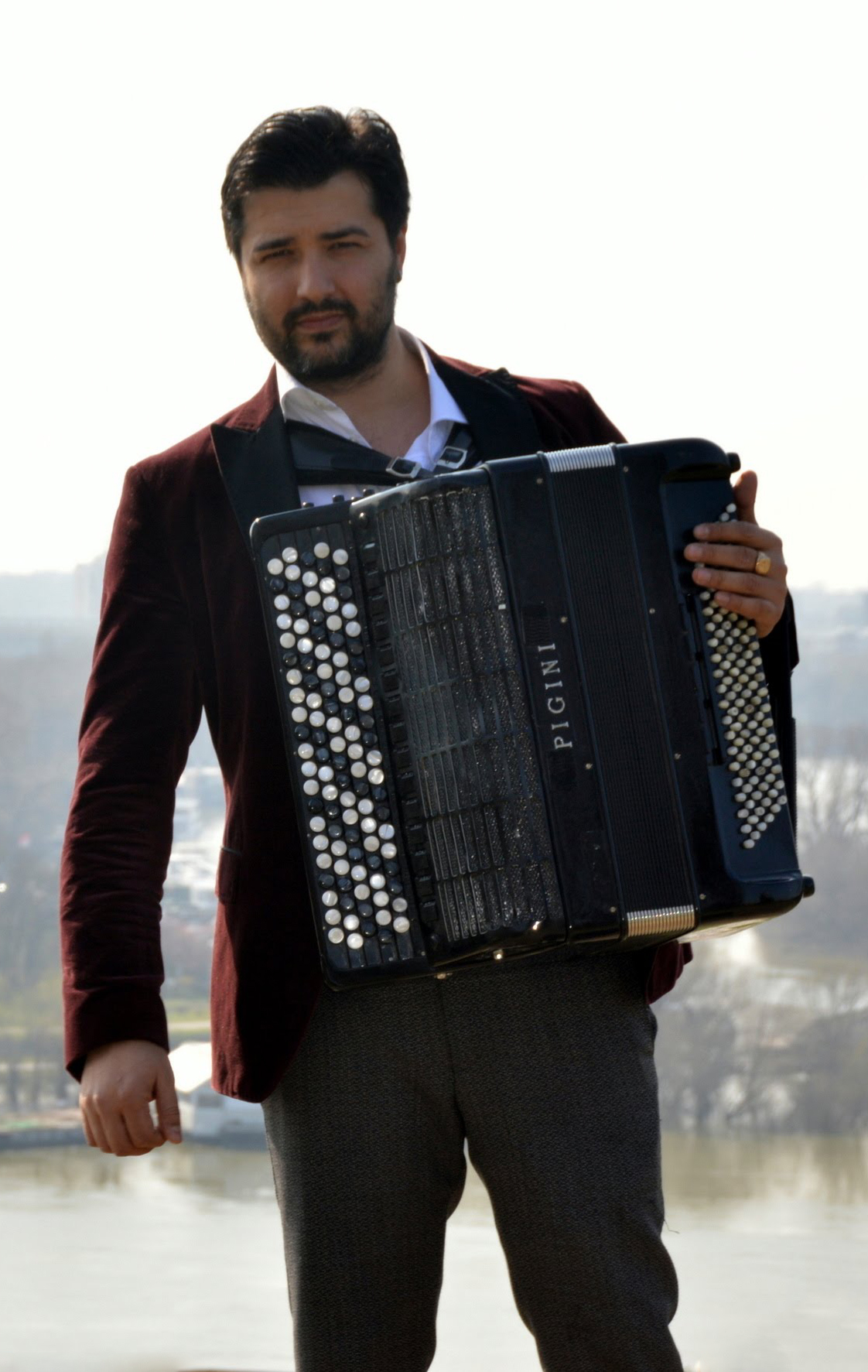

Background information
- Born: Vukašinović Srdjan; Petrovac, Serbia
- Genres: Classical; folk
- Occupations: Musician; Inventor; Professor
- Instrument: Accordion
- Years active: 1999–present
- Website: srdjanvukasinovic.com

Srdjan Vukašinović is a classical and folk accordionist of Serbian-Swiss origin. He was born in Petrovac, Serbia into a musical family. At the age of 16 in 1999, he won first prize for accordion players at the World Trophy Competition in Spain. He has been noted by the classical music community as one of the best accordion players in the world.

== Career ==
Vukašinović performs with orchestras such as the Argovia Philharmonic and the Klassik Nuevo Orchestra. In October 2018 he performed with the Royal Philharmonic Orchestra and became the first accordion player to appear with them. Vukašinović has collaborated with violinist Gilles Apap, pianist Fazıl Say, and flamenco/jazz bassist Carles Benavent. He also performs in the world music duo Meduoteran with baglama player Taylan Arikan.

Vukašinović invented the world's first a quarter-tone accordion. With Srdjan’s accordion, it is possible to play all 24 quarter tones within a single octave, especially on the button accordion, without changing the finger positions. All other accordions that were developed later, without knowledge of his patent, are merely tuned differently but are technically the same as any other accordion. He founded the new "Carboneon" brand of accordion, the first made from carbon fiber, which renders it the lightest accordion in the world. He is a professor of Balkan Music at the University of Arts in Zurich and also the art director for the Meldoyaarau festival. He co-founded the Klassik Nuevo festival to promote classical and folk music to a younger audience.
