= Kojić =

Kojić may refer to:

- Dragan Kojić Keba (born 1956 or 1960), Serbian singer
- Igor Kojić (born 1987), Serbian footballer
- Milan Kojić (born 1976), Canadian soccer player
- Nemanja Kojić (athlete) (born 1994), Serbian track athlete
- Nemanja Kojić (footballer) (born 1990), Serbian footballer
- Nemanja Kojić (musician) (born 1975), Serbian musician better known by his stage name Hornsman Coyote (or Kojot)
- Rajko Kojić (1956–1997), Serbian guitarist
