= Vuk Vrhovac =

Croatian endocrinologist (1903–1952)

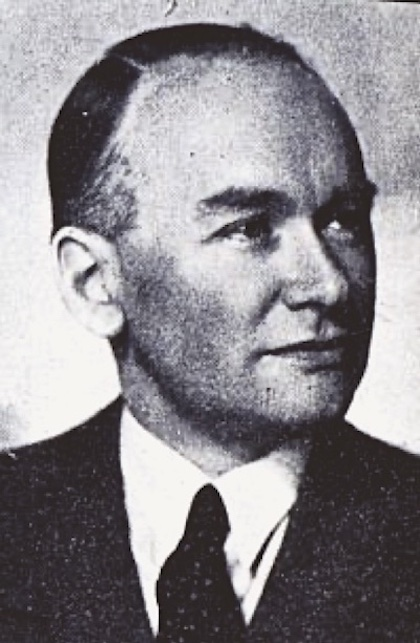
- Born: 1903
- Died: 1952 (aged 49)
- Occupation: Endocrinologist
- Known for: Insulin production in the Kingdom of Yugoslavia

Vuk Vrhovac (13 November 1903 – 26 May 1952) was a Croatian physician, pioneer of diabetology and the organizer of the domestic production of insulin and liver preparations in the 1930s in Yugoslavia.

In 1933 and 1934 as a fellow of the Rockefeller foundation he studied at the University of Toronto in Frederick Banting’s laboratory. He also visits other academic institutions in the United States and Canada. Upon return, he organized the first Yugoslav insulin in Zagreb in 1935. The insulin is standardized according to the League of Nations recommendations in 1940 (Insulin-Zagreb).

In 1940, he founded the diabetes counselling centre in Zagreb. It assembled clinical practice, research and education in the same institute, a novelty in diabetes treatment at the time.

Studied clinical endocrinology in 1947 in England, Switzerland, and Sweden as a World Health Organization fellow.

He was a prominent representative of the temperance movement in Yugoslavia along with Andrija Štampar. He served as a professor at the School of Medicine, University of Zagreb and was a corresponding member of the Yugoslav Academy of Sciences and Arts (JAZU).

The Vuk Vrhovac University Clinic in Zagreb bears his name, a World Health Organization (WHO) Collaborating Centre and the Reference Centre of the Republic of Croatia for diabetes.

The clinic is a globally renowned centre for diabetes, known for the "Croatian Model" which pioneered diabetes treatment in developing countries, as well as a co-founder of the St. Vincent Declaration in 1989.
