= Vis =

Vis, ViS, VIS, and other capitalizations may refer to:

== Places ==
- Vis (island), a Croatian island in the Adriatic sea
  - Vis (town), on the island of Vis
- Vis (river), in south-central France
- Vis, Bulgaria, a village in Haskovo Province
- Visalia Municipal Airport (IATA and FAA:VIS), California
- Viš, a village in Montenegro

== Organizations ==
- Vanguard International Semiconductor Corporation, an IC foundry in Taipei, Taiwan
- Vasil Iliev Security (VIS and VIS-2), former front companies for a criminal organization in Bulgaria
- Vatican Information Service, the official news service of the Vatican
- VAZInterService, an automobile manufacturer in Russia
- Vavoua International School, an international boarding school in Côte d'Ivoire
- Victorian Institute of Sport, a government sporting institute in Victoria, Australia
- Vienna Independent Shorts, an annual international film festival in Vienna, Austria
- Vienna International School, a school for the children of UN employees and diplomats in Vienna, Austria
- VIS Entertainment, a former video game developer in Scotland
- Viacom International Studios, a division of Paramount International Networks

== Science and technology ==
- Vaccine Information Statement, a formal vaccine description published by the United States Centers for Disease Control
- Variable intake system, or variable-length intake manifold, an internal combustion engine technology
- Tandy Video Information System, a multimedia CD-ROM console from the early 1990s
- Viewable image size, the amount of screen space available on display without obstruction
- Visible spectrum, the portion of the electromagnetic radiation spectrum that is visible to the human eyes
- Visual Instruction Set, a SIMD instruction set for SPARC processors
- Visa Information System, a biometric database for visa applications in the Schengen area of the EU

== Other uses ==
- Vis (surname), a Dutch surname, including a list of people named Vis
- Vis., taxonomic abbreviation for Roberto de Visiani (1800-1878), Dalmatian Italian botanist
- vis, the possessive form of the English neologistic gender-neutral pronoun ve
- Vis Pesaro, an Italian association football club
- FB Vis, a type of Polish handgun
- The heroine of the 11th century Persian love story Vis and Rāmin
- Willem C. Vis Moot, an international arbitration moot court held annually in Vienna, Austria

== See also ==
- Vis-à-vis (disambiguation)
- Visibility (disambiguation)
- Viz (disambiguation)
