= Carnival Sunrise =

Destiny-class cruise ship

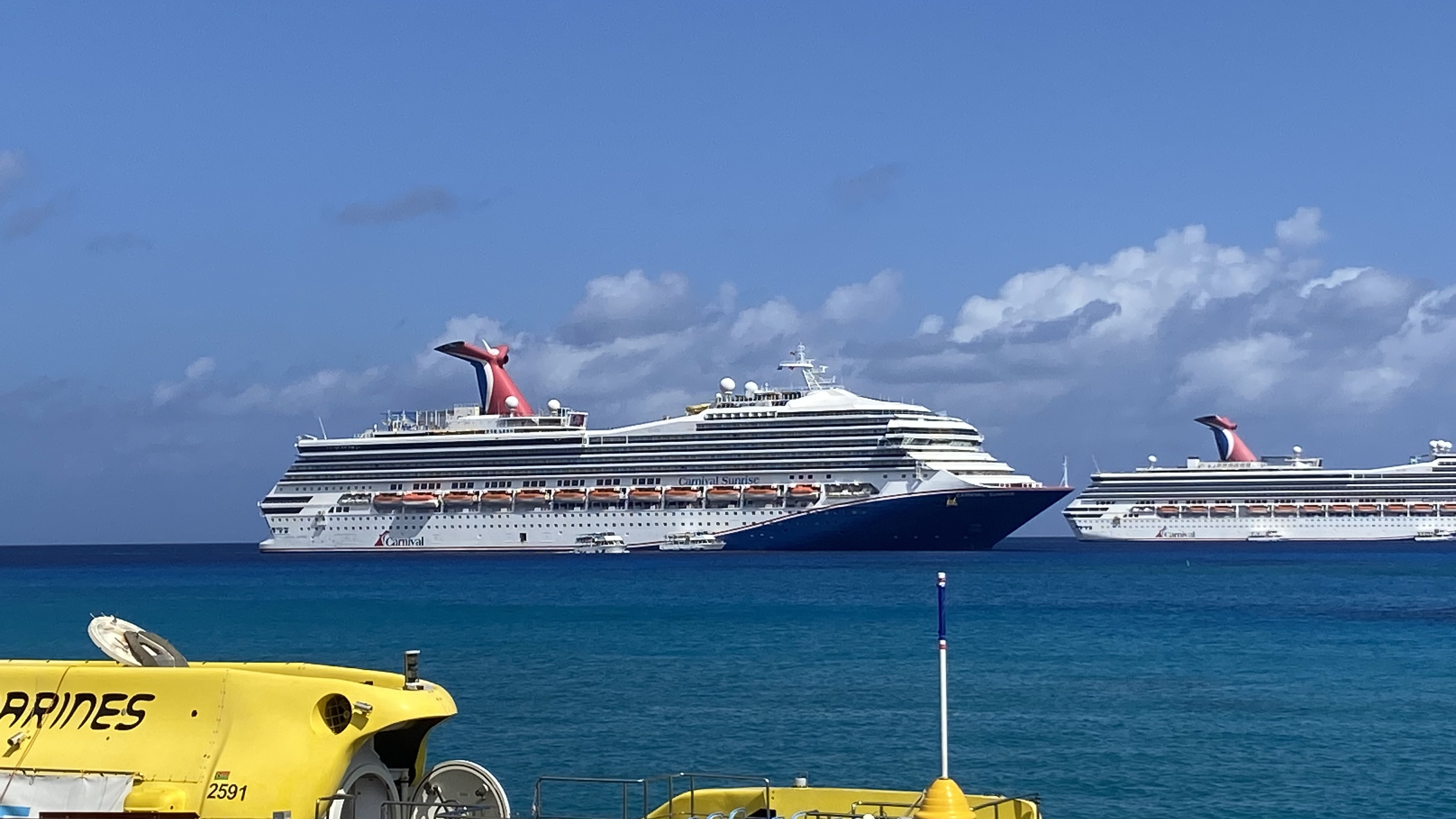
- Carnival Sunrise anchored and docked at George Town, Grand Cayman on May 1, 2025

History

Bahamas
- Name: 1999–2019: Carnival Triumph; 2019–present: Carnival Sunrise
- Owner: Carnival Corporation
- Operator: Carnival Cruise Line
- Port of registry: Nassau, Bahamas
- Route: Eastern and Western Caribbean
- Builder: Fincantieri; Monfalcone, Italy
- Cost: US$420 million
- Yard number: 5979
- Launched: July 27, 1999
- Christened: Madeline Arison- July 25, 1999 (Carnival Triumph) Kelly Arison- May 23, 2019 (Carnival Sunrise)
- Completed: 1999
- Maiden voyage: October 23, 1999
- In service: July 27, 1999-10 February 2013, June 13, 2013-present
- Out of service: February 10, 2013-June 13, 2013
- Identification: Call sign: C6FN5; IMO number: 9138850; MMSI number: 308045000
- Status: In service

General characteristics
- Class & type: Destiny-class cruise ship
- Tonnage: 101,509 GT; 10,984 DWT
- Length: 893 ft 4 in (272.3 m)
- Beam: 116 ft 6 in (35.5 m)
- Draft: 27 ft 3 in (8.3 m)
- Decks: 13 decks
- Installed power: 2 × Wärtsilä-Sulzer 12ZAV40S; 4 × Wärtsilä-Sulzer 16ZAV40S
- Propulsion: Diesel-electric; two shafts (2 × 17.6 MW); Two controllable pitch propellers; Six maneuvering thrusters
- Speed: 21 knots (39 km/h; 24 mph) (service); 22.5 knots (41.7 km/h; 25.9 mph) (maximum)
- Capacity: 2,984 passengers
- Crew: 1,108

Carnival Sunrise (formerly Carnival Triumph) is a Destiny-class cruise ship operated by Carnival Cruise Line. As she and her three younger sisters (Carnival Radiance, costa Fortuna, and costa Magica) are each a redesigned version of the lead ship in the class, she is sometimes referred to as the first of the Triumph class of cruise ships. Carnival Sunrise is homeported at Miami, Florida.

Built by Fincantieri at its Monfalcone shipyard in Friuli-Venezia Giulia, northern Italy, she was floated out on October 23, 1999, and christened by Madeline Arison, wife of Micky Arison, the then-CEO (now Chairman of Carnival Corporation) of Carnival.

== Design ==
Carnival Sunrise is 893 feet 4 inches (272.3 m) long and has a beam of 116 feet 6 inches (35.5 m). Fully laden, she draws 27 feet 3 inches (8.3 m) of water. The vessel's gross tonnage, which is a measure of volume and not of weight, is 101,509.

Carnival Sunrise has a diesel-electric propulsion system in which the main generators provide electricity for all shipboard functions from propulsion motors to hotel systems such as air conditioning and lighting. Her power plant consists of six diesel generating sets, four 16-cylinder Wärtsilä-Sulzer 16ZAV40S and two 12-cylinder 12ZAV40S medium-speed diesel engines. Her two 17.6-megawatt electric propulsion motors and controllable pitch propellers give the ship a maximum speed of 22.5 knots (41.7 km/h; 25.9 mph) and a service speed of about 20 knots (37 km/h; 23 mph). For maneuvering at ports, Carnival Sunrise has six transverse thrusters. She was completed and entered service in 1999.

== Service history ==
=== Carnival Triumph ===
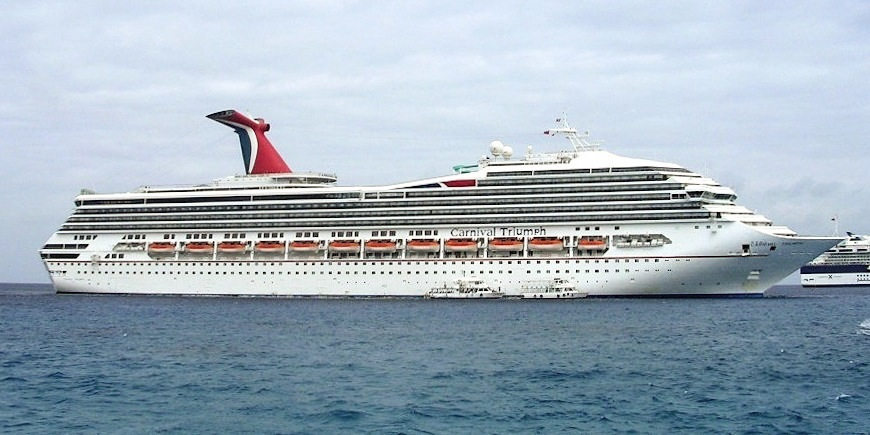
Carnival Triumph at George Town, Grand Cayman, on April 20, 2005

On March 29, 2012, an American judge ordered the ship to be held at Galveston, Texas. The move came as part of a $10 million lawsuit filed in federal court in Galveston by relatives of a German tourist who died in the Costa Concordia disaster. Reports said that the warrant ordering the ship held in port states that "the court finds that the conditions for an attachment of defendants' joint and collective property within this district, mainly the MS Carnival Triumph, appear to exist upon an admiralty and maritime claim". Carnival Triumph was allowed to unload passengers and cargo and move between berths until a hearing could be scheduled.

=== 2013 Poop Cruise ===
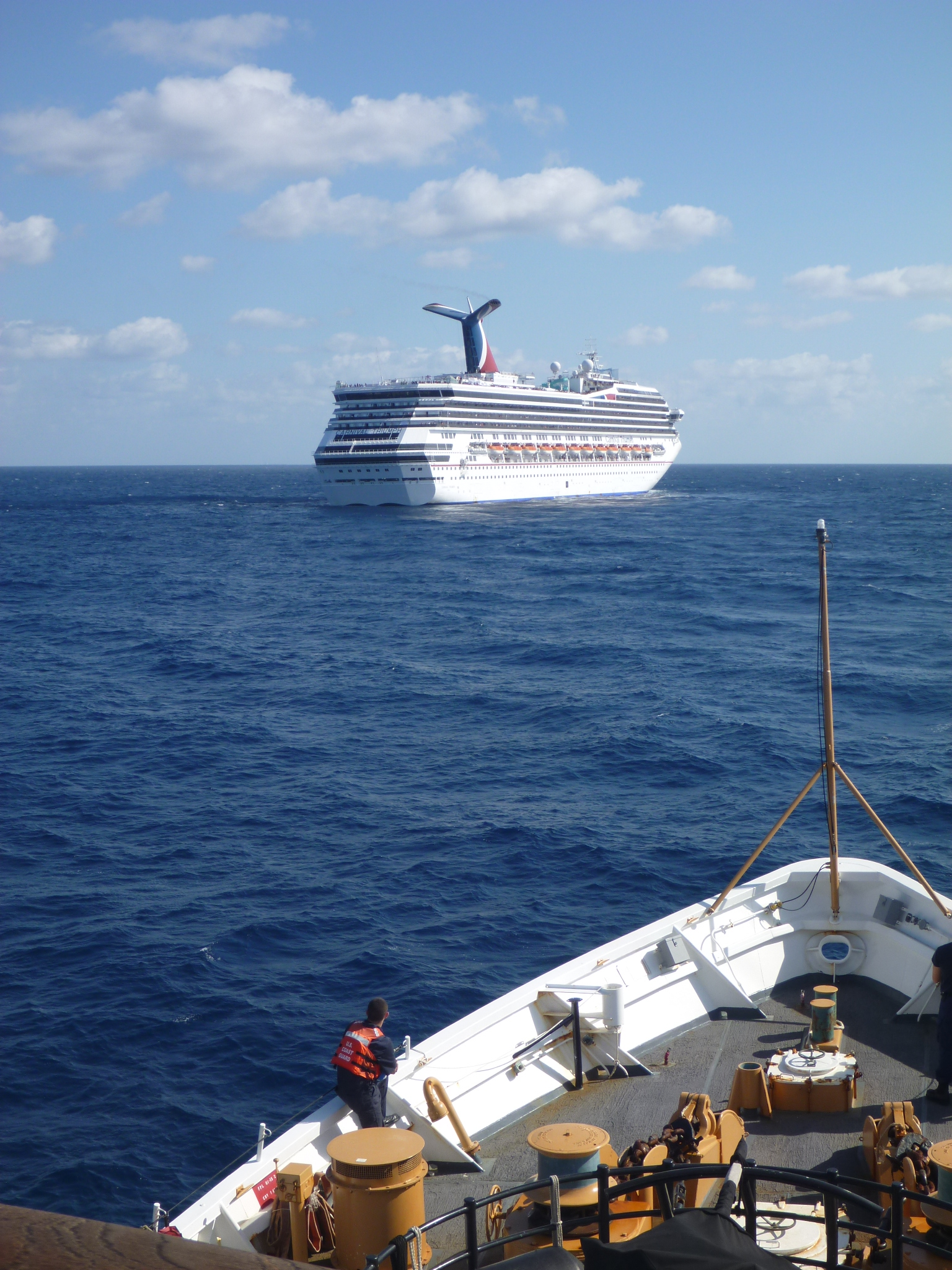
The Coast Guard cutter USCGC Vigorous stands by to assist Carnival Triumph in the Gulf of Mexico on February 11, 2013.

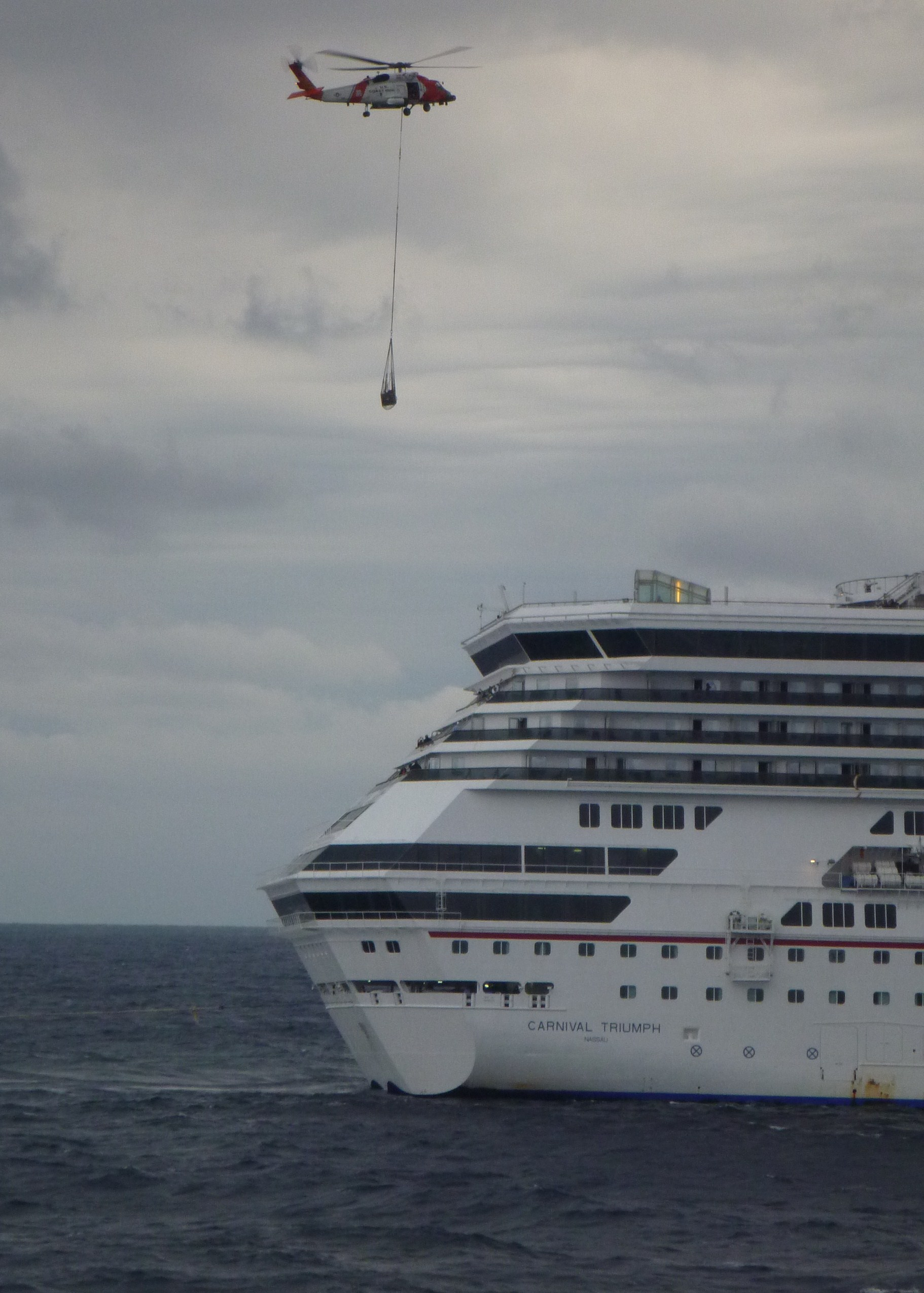
A Coast Guard helicopter delivers approximately 3,000 lb (1,400 kg) of equipment, which included a generator and electrical cables, to Carnival Triumph in the Gulf of Mexico, February 13, 2013.

On February 10, 2013, at 5:30 a.m. CST, the ship suffered a fire in the aft engine room. Although the fire was automatically extinguished and there were no injuries to passengers or crew, it resulted in a loss of power and propulsion. Raw sewage began to back up into passenger deck areas, creating a major health hazard. This caused the media to dub the event "The Poop Cruise". Carnival Triumph was originally expected to be towed to the Mexican port of Progreso. However, after being carried north by currents while awaiting arrival of large, seagoing tugboats, she was expected to dock in Mobile, Alabama, instead.

By February 11, 2013, her emergency electrical generators allowed partial restoration of some shipboard functions. During the night of February 10, supplies were transferred from Carnival Elation. Carnival Legend was en route from Tampa and arrived on the scene around 3:00 p.m. on the afternoon of February 11 to complete a transfer of food and water and to take on a patient in need of dialysis for transport to Cozumel. Carnival Conquest en route to Montego Bay, Jamaica from New Orleans stopped and delivered food and supplies during the afternoon and early evening on February 11, 2013.

On the afternoon of February 13, two seagoing tugboats were towing the ship, with a third tugboat expected to arrive that evening. The goal was to reach port in Mobile by early afternoon on February 14, but strong winds delayed the expected arrival. Eventually, four tugboats were towing the ship, with a fifth on standby. After a tow line broke, arrival was delayed still further. The ship finally docked by 9:20 p.m.

An incident investigation was then started by the Bahamas Maritime Authority, the U.S. Coast Guard, and the National Transportation Safety Board. The Bahamas Maritime Authority was the lead investigative agency, because Carnival Triumph is a Bahamian-flagged ship. Initial reports from investigators on February 18 indicated the fire was caused by a leak in a flexible fuel oil return line from the No. 6 diesel engine, allowing fuel to spill onto a hot surface and ignite. It was then revealed by the cruise line's maintenance records that problems and the potential for an incident had formed more than a year before the cruise. The aforementioned diesel generator was overdue for maintenance for more than a year before the cruise, and there had been a total of nine incidents of fuel leaks from flexible fuel lines over the previous two years.

Two weeks prior to the engine room fire, Carnival Triumph experienced propulsion issues that caused it to be five hours late returning to its Galveston home port on January 28, 2013, delayed the ship's departure for its next cruise from 2:30 p.m. until 8:00 p.m. that night, and resulted in the elimination of a scheduled stop in Cozumel because of the ship's diminished cruising speed. While in port, a Port State Control (PSC) vessel inspection by the Texas City, Texas, U.S. Coast Guard Marine Safety Unit was conducted, resulting in a finding that there was "a short in the high voltage connection box of one of the ships [sic] generators causing damage to cables within the connection box", a deficiency under 50AC SOLAS 2009 Ch 1 Reg 11. A directive with a compliance due date of February 27, 2013, was issued following the inspection, requiring that "the condition of the ship and its equipment shall be maintained to conform with the regulations to ensure that the ship in all respects will remain fit to proceed to sea without danger to the ship or persons on board". The Coast Guard Marine Information Safety and Law Enforcement System showed that this deficiency remained unresolved at the time of the subsequent fire and loss of power while at sea on February 10.

Sailings up to April 13 were canceled, after which Carnival announced the first phase of a fleetwide review, to include installation of back-up generator systems on the line's ships. To allow time for the generators to be installed aboard Carnival Triumph, ten more voyages were cancelled, through June 3. This was the fourth engine room fire on a Carnival-owned ship resulting in a loss of power, including Tropicale in 1999, Carnival Splendor in 2010, and Costa Allegra, owned by a Carnival subsidiary, in 2012. Carnival announced that they were spending $300 million for a fleet-wide safety upgrade targeted at preventing any potential fire hazards to make sure this never happens again.

On April 3, 2013, while Carnival Triumph was docked in Mobile, Alabama, for repairs following the February 10 fire, gale-force winds caused the ship to break free from her moorings and strike a moored United States Army Corps of Engineers vessel, Dredge Wheeler, sustaining a 20 ft (6.1 m) gash and railing damage on her stern above the water line before coming to rest against a cargo ship. The U.S. Coast Guard and tug boats responded to the scene. Repairs for the ship were then delayed by ten days, causing cancellation of two more cruises before the ship returned to service on June 13, 2013.

=== Carnival Sunrise ===
In 2019, Carnival Triumph docked in Cadiz, Spain to undergo a $200 million refurbishment. Upon completion of the refit, she was renamed Carnival Sunrise. The ship was officially renamed by Kelly Arison, the daughter of Carnival Corporation Chairman Micky Arison. The ceremony took place on May 23 in New York.
