= Circle the wagons =

English language idiom

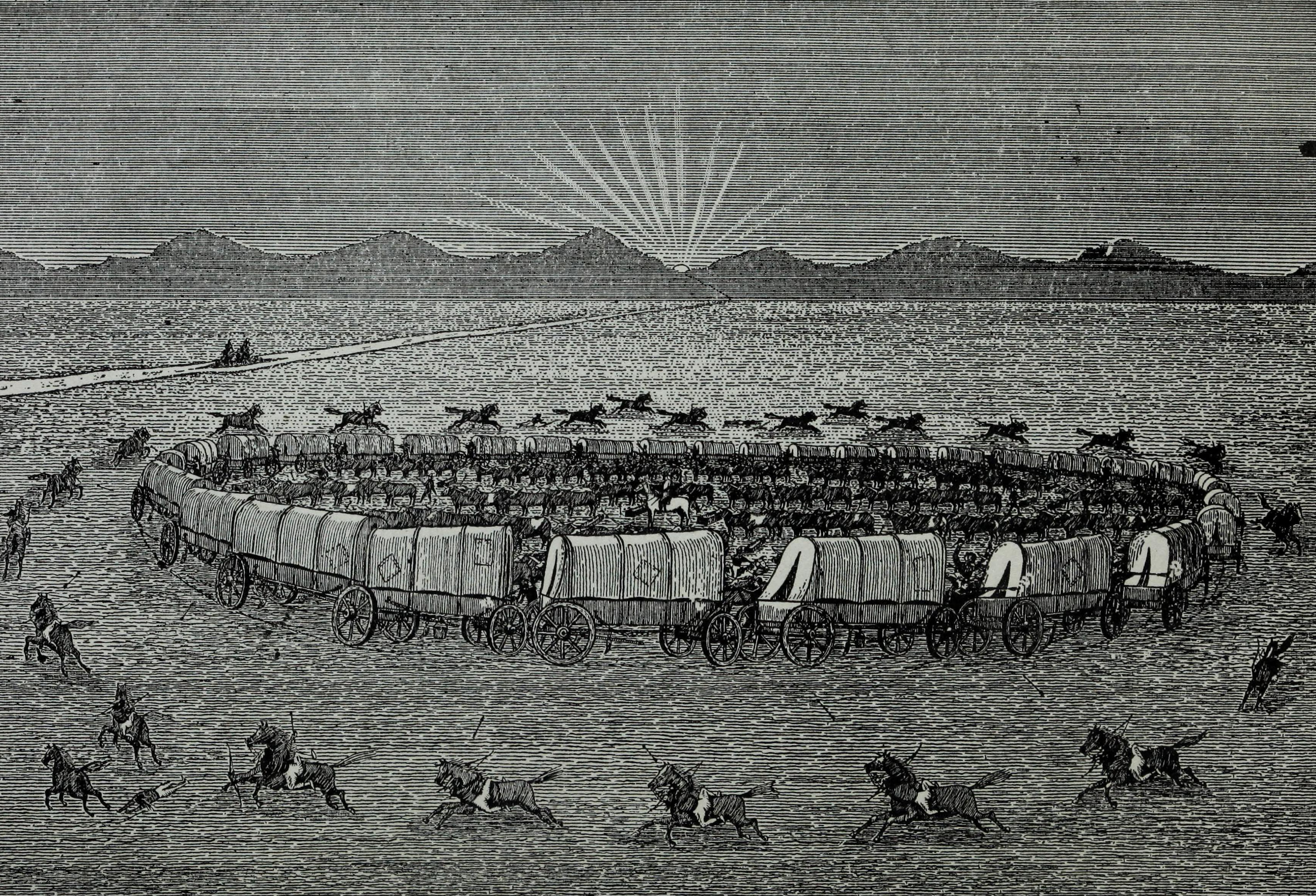
1912 illustration of Native Americans attacking a circled wagon train formed by American pioneers

Circle the wagons is an English language idiom which may refer to a group of people uniting for a common purpose. Historically the term was used to describe a defensive maneuver which was employed by Americans in the 19th century. The term has evolved colloquially to mean people defending each other.

== Etymology ==
In America during the mid 1800s many pioneers traveled west by wagon. Typically these were Conestoga wagons and they traveled west in a single file line known as a wagon train. At night the wagons would form a circle around their encampment and livestock for defensive reasons.

"Circling the wagons" is still an idiomatic expression for a person or group preparing to defend themselves against attack or criticism.

== English language uses ==
In contemporary English the phrase Circle the wagons is often used figuratively and idiomatically to describe members of a group protecting each other, for instance when political parties and groups defend their own views and chastise those outside of their group. The term frequently describes rival factions banding together to support one another.

== See also ==
- Adage
- Comprehension of idioms
- English-language idioms
- Morphology (linguistics)
