= Transparency =

Transparency, transparence or transparent most often refer to:

- Transparency and translucency in optics, referring to the transmitting of light through materials

(Note: Many of the articles listed below use "transparency" metaphorically, meaning that everything is visible or that nothing is hidden.)

Transparency may also refer to:

== Literal uses ==
- Transparency (photography), a transparent photograph
- Transparency (projection), for use with an overhead projector
- Electromagnetically induced transparency

== Animals and plants ==
- Fish species:
  - Asiatic glassfish
  - Transparent goby
- White Transparent, a cultivar of apple

== Arts, entertainment, and media ==
=== Music ===
==== Groups and labels ====
- Transparency (record label), North America
- Transparent (band), New York, US

==== Albums ====
- Transparency (album), by the Herb Robertson Quintet, 1985
- Transparent (Coil album), 1984
- Transparent (LaRue album), 2001
- Transparente (album), by Mariza, 2005
- Transparence, by Markize, 2007

==== Songs ====
- "Transparency", by PartyNextDoor from the album PartyNextDoor 3
- "Transparency", by SoFaygo from the album Pink Heartz
- "Transparent", by In Flames from the album Reroute to Remain
- "Transparent", by Suzi Quatro from album Main Attraction
- "Transparence", by Reflections from the album The Color Clear

=== Other uses in arts, entertainment, and media ===
- Transparent (book), by Cris Beam
- Transparent (film), a 2005 documentary
- Transparent (TV series), US

== Computing and mathematics ==
- Transparency (data compression), perceptually lossless
- Transparency (human–computer interaction), a change not affecting interface
- Transparency (telecommunication), transmitting signal unchanged
  - Network transparency
- Alpha compositing, creating apparent transparency
  - Image masks in computer graphics
  - Transparency (graphic) in image formats
  - Transparency (pseudo), in X or X11 Window System
- Location transparency, independence of location
- Order-independent transparency in 3D computer graphics
- Referential transparency, replacing subexpressions without changing the value of the expression
- Security through transparency, security where all except the key is known

== Humanities and business ==
- Transparency (behavior), making it easily seen what actions have been taken
  - Open government#Transparency
- Transparency (linguistic)
- Transparency (market), concept in economics where everything is known in a market
- Transparency (science), open accessibility of scientific research
- Transparency (trade), clear foreign trade regulations
- Compensation transparency, pay fully disclosed
- Epistemic transparency, a concept in philosophy
- Media transparency, open handling of news
- Radical transparency of previously confidential data
- Transparency of experience, a concept in philosophy of mind

== Organizations ==
- Transparency (Guatemala) (Transparencia), a political party
- Transparency International, anti-corruption organization

== Other uses ==
- Transparency (wine), the ability of a wine to portray all unique aspects of its flavor
- Translucency (philosophy), the imperfect ability to discern other' dispositions

== See also ==
- Clarity (disambiguation)
- Visibility (disambiguation)
- The Transparent Society
