= Viz =

Viz or VIZ may refer to:

- Aerovis Airlines (ICAO: VIZ), a cargo airline based in Kyiv, Ukraine
- Viz., a synonym for “namely”
- Viz (comics), a British adult comic magazine
  - Viz: The Game, a computer game based on the comic
- Viz Media, an American manga and anime distribution and entertainment company
- "Viz", a song from the 2004 Le Tigre album This Island
- Visualization (disambiguation), the practice of creating visual representations of complex data and information
- Vizcaya station (Station code: VIZ), a Metrorail metro station in Miami, Florida, United States
- Vizrt, a Norwegian digital media software company

== See also ==
- Hi viz (disambiguation)
- Vis-à-vis (disambiguation)
- VIZ-Stal, a Russian producer of cold-rolled electrical steels
- WVIZ, an American TV station
