= Visibility (disambiguation) =

Visibility, in meteorology, is a measure of the distance at which an object or light can be seen.

Visibility may also refer to:

- A measure of turbidity in water quality control
- Interferometric visibility, which quantifies interference contrast in optics
- The reach of information hiding, in computing
- Visibility (geometry), a geometric abstraction of real-life visibility
- Visible spectrum, the portion of the electromagnetic spectrum that is visible to the human eye
- Visual perception
  - Naked-eye visibility

Visible may also refer to:

- Visible (album), a 1985 album by CANO
- Visible: Out on Television, a 2020 miniseries from Apple TV+, about LGBTQ+ representation in TV
- Visible spectrum, light which can be seen by the human eye
- Visible by Verizon, an offshoot phone service from Verizon Communications

== See also ==
- Transparency (disambiguation)
- Vis (disambiguation)
- Vision (disambiguation)
