= Visio (ship) =

Cruise ship built in 2004

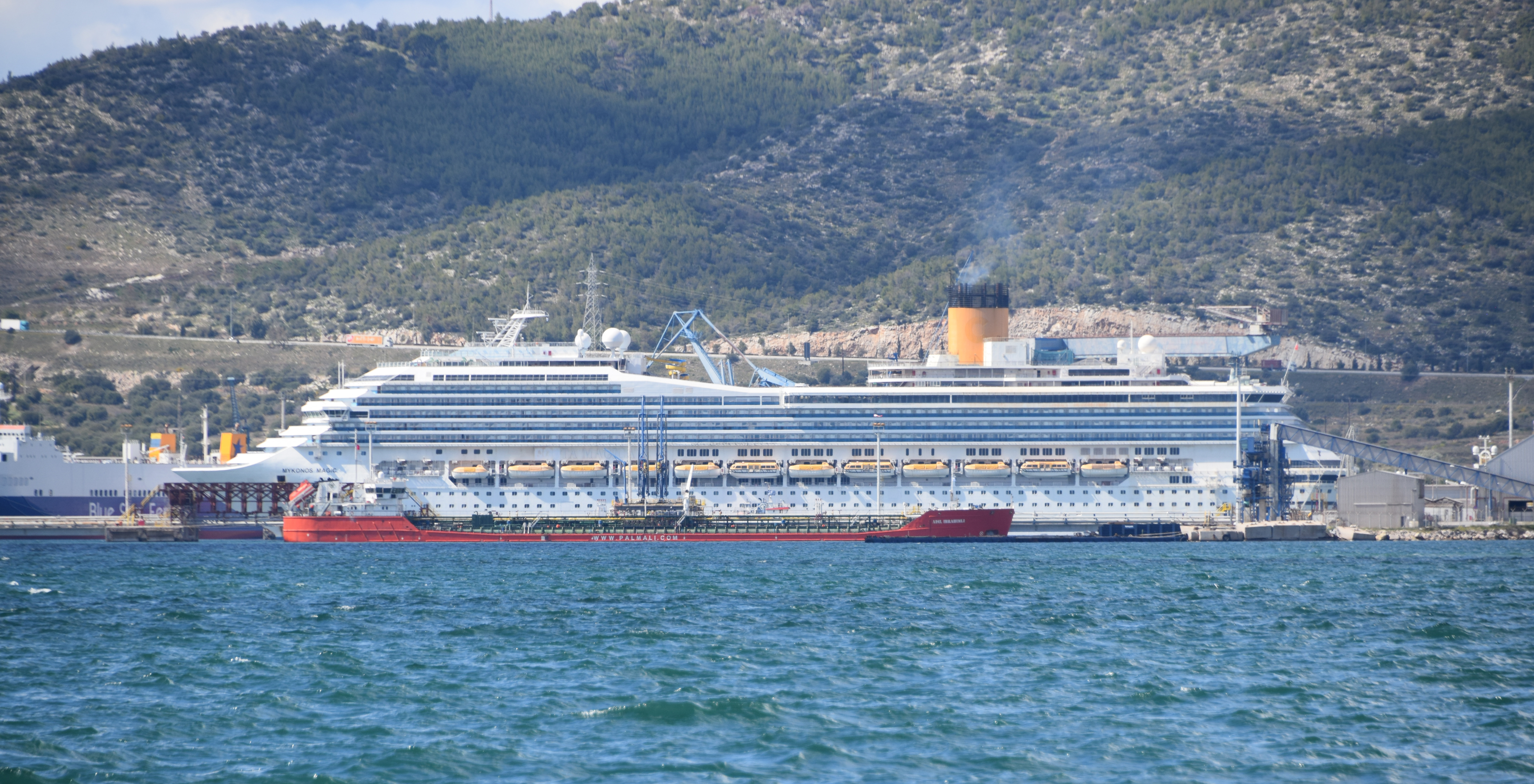
- Mykonos Magic in Eleusis, 2024

History

Bermuda
- Name: Costa Magica (2004–2023); Mykonos Magic (2023–2024); Goddess of the Night (2024–2025); Vision (2025–2026); Visio (2026–present)
- Owner: Carnival Corporation & plc (2004–2023); Seajets (2023–2025); Tianjin Orient International Cruise Line (2025–present)
- Operator: Costa Crociere (2004–2023); laid up (2023–2025); Tianjin Orient International Cruise Line (2026–present)
- Port of registry: Italy, Genoa (2004–2023); Bermuda, Hamilton (2023–present)
- Builder: Fincantieri, Genoa, Italy
- Yard number: 6087
- Laid down: 1 September 2002
- Launched: 14 November 2003
- Completed: 26 October 2004
- Maiden voyage: 1 November 2004
- In service: 2004–2020; 2025–present
- Out of service: 2020–2025
- Identification: IMO number: 9239795; Call sign: ZCHE3 (from 2023); MMSI number: 310834000 (from 2023)
- Status: In Service

General characteristics
- Class & type: Destiny-class cruise ship
- Tonnage: 102,784 GT; 9,859 DWT
- Length: 272 m (892 ft 5 in) oa
- Beam: 35.5 m (116 ft 6 in)
- Decks: 13
- Propulsion: 2 × diesel engines, 2 × propellers
- Speed: 20 knots (37 km/h; 23 mph)
- Capacity: 2,718 passengers
- Crew: 1,068

Visio is a Destiny-class cruise ship owned by Tianjin Oriental International Cruises since 2023. Formerly operating as Costa Magica by Costa Crociere, a subsidiary of Carnival Corporation & plc, the 102,784 GT vessel joined sister ship Costa Fortuna in 2004 and were referred together as Fortuna-class ships; together, they became the largest ships in the Costa fleet at her time of delivery. Costa Magica paid homage to some of the most famous destinations in Italy including Positano, Portofino, Bellagio, and Sicily, which were incorporated into her public areas and restaurants. 19 years after her debut, Costa sold Costa Magica to Greek/Cypriot ferry company Seajets in 2023 and she was subsequently renamed Mykonos Magic. It was later sold to the current owners in 2025, and began service under the brand in 2026. It currently sails out of Tianjin, sailing to destinations in South Korea.

== Design and description ==
The vessel was designed by the American architect Joe Farcus and it is the sister ship to Costa Fortuna. As originally built, Costa Magica had a gross tonnage (GT) of 102,857 and 8,200 tons deadweight (DWT). This later increased to 102,784 GT and 9,859 DWT. The cruise ship measures 272 metres (892 ft 5 in) long overall and 230 metres (754 ft 7 in) between perpendiculars with a beam of 35.5 metres (116 ft 6 in). (Note: Ward has the length as 272.3 metres (893 ft 4 in).)

The ship is powered by two diesel engines turning two fixed pitch propellers that create 34,000 kilowatts (46,000 hp) of power. The ship has two azimuth thruster pods, thus allowing a maximum speed of 20 knots (37 km/h; 23 mph). The vessel is also equipped with seven electric-generating sets that create 64,610 kilowatts (86,640 hp) of power.

As Costa Magica, she had 1,359 cabins total, ranging in size from 16.7–44.8 m^{2} (180–482 sq ft). 522 cabins had a balcony. The ship's total capacity included 2,718 passengers and a crew of 1,068. Also included in the design was a nine-deck atrium with a bar on the lowest level, a 1,300 m^{2} (14,000 ft^{2}) spa, and a three-deck theatre.

== Construction and career ==
The ship was constructed by Fincantieri in Genoa, Italy with the yard number 6087. The vessel was laid down on 1 September 2002 and launched in November 2003. She was completed on 26 October 2004 and entered service in the following month. The vessel was owned and operated by Costa Crociere and registered in Genoa.

=== 2020 COVID-19 pandemic ===
On 12 March 2020, two passengers aboard were reported to have tested positive for COVID-19 while quarantined in Martinique. The ship, with 3,300 people on board, had been disallowed entry to several sea ports including Grenada, Tobago, Barbados and Saint Lucia, due to over 300 Italian nationals on board. On 16 March, the ship was allowed only to take on provisions and refuel at St. Maarten with no one allowed to leave the ship.

It was later reported that passengers from the ship disembarked in mid-March leaving just the crew aboard. The ship then travelled to Miami, Florida but was not allowed to dock there. 13 crew members were evacuated from Costa Magica and Costa Favolosa to hospitals in Miami after displaying COVID-19 symptoms. The rest of the crew were tested aboard both ships which were lying three miles (4.8 km) off Miami and Eventually, the ship stopped three miles (4.8 km) offshore from Miami, and on 26 March, the U.S. Coast Guard reported evacuation of six sick crew members from the ship. On 30 March, those who tested negative were taken to the airport and put aboard charter flights to repatriate them to their home nations. Those who tested positive remained aboard the ships, which then sailed for Europe.

An update by CNN on 3 April 2020 stated the ship remained near Miami after "six crew members with respiratory symptoms were evacuated from the ship, and then transported to a hospital". The Port of Miami had not provided consent for the vessel to dock but all passengers had previously disembarked at Guadeloupe.

=== Canceled transfer to Carnival Cruise Line ===
On 23 June 2021, it was announced that Costa Magica would be rebranded and transferred to the Carnival fleet in mid-2022, receive a new Carnival name and funnel, and would most likely join the Sunshine-class. On 14 June 2022, Carnival said that Costa Magica would remain in the Costa fleet, with Costa Luminosa to be transferred instead.

=== Sale to Seajets ===
On 8 February 2023, Costa Magica's sale to Seajets, a Greek/Cypriot ferry company, was reported. She was later laid up in Greece and renamed Mykonos Magic. In April 2024 Seajets revealed their intention to re-activate the ship for a new cruise operation, Neonyx Cruises, to launch in July with the name Goddess of the Night, and offering an adults-only "ultimate party experience" in the Aegean. Mykonos Magic was sent to a Turkish shipyard for a refit.

Prior to commencing cruising with Neonyx, the ship was chartered to provide accommodation at Brindisi for 2,000 security police for the Group of Seven summit in June 2024. Following complaints about sanitary conditions, including flooded cabins, malfunctioning toilets and broken showers, alternative arrangements had to be made and the ship was impounded. The ship also failed a port state control inspection by the Italian maritime authorities on 20 June, and was detained for six days with 16 deficiencies mostly related to ship safety. In July Neonyx said that, due to delays in the refurbishment, Goddess of the Night's inaugural season had been postponed until 2025.

=== Operations by Tianjin Orient ===
The ship was renamed to the Vision and sold to Tianjin Orient International Cruises in late 2025. After sale, the ship was officially named Visio and began service on March 2, 2026, with it homeporting in Tianjin, with itineraries to South Korea. The Visio made its maiden voyage from Dalian on May 12, 2026.
