= Vision =

Vision, Visions, or The Vision may refer to:

== Perception ==
=== Optical perception ===
- Visual perception, the sense of sight
- Visual system, the physical mechanism of eyesight
- Computer vision, a field dealing with how computers can be made to gain understanding from digital images or videos
- Machine vision, technology for imaging-based automatic inspection

=== Perception of the future ===
- Foresight (psychology), in business, the ability to envisage future market trends and plan accordingly
- Goal, a desired result
  - Vision statement, a declaration of objectives to guide decision-making

=== Other perceptions ===
- Vision (spirituality), a supernatural experience that conveys a revelation
- Hallucination, a perception of something that does not exist

== Arts and media ==
=== Events ===
- Vision Festival, a New York City art festival
- Visions (convention), a science fiction event

=== Film and television ===
==== Film ====
- Vision (2009 film), German film
- Vision (2018 film), Japanese-French film
- The Vision (film), 1998 British television movie
- Vision (Marvel Cinematic Universe), a film character that debuted in 2015, based on the original Marvel Comics character
- Visions (2015 film), American thriller
- Visions (2023 film), French psychological thriller

==== TV series ====
- "Vision" (Marvel Studios: Legends), an episode of Marvel Studios: Legends
- "The Vision", episode of Alcoa Presents: One Step Beyond
- "The Vision" (The Amazing World of Gumball), an episode of The Amazing World of Gumball
- Visions (1976 TV series), a 1976–80 anthology series on PBS
- Visions (2022 TV series), French TV series, called Beyond Signs in Australia
- Star Wars: Visions, a 2022–present anthology series on Disney+

==== TV services ====
- VisionTV, Canadian TV channel
- BT Vision, British digital TV service

=== Literature ===
==== Comics ====
- Vision (Marvel Comics), a Marvel Comics superhero character that debuted in 1968
- Vision (Jonas), a Marvel Comics character that first appeared in Young Avengers in 2005
- Vision (Timely Comics), a Timely Comics character that debuted in 1940

==== Other literature ====
- A Vision, a 1925 nonfiction book by W. B. Yeats
- Vision (magazine), an Emirati magazine
- The Vision (magazine), an Indian spiritual magazine
- The Vision (novel), a 1977 novel by Dean Koontz
- Visions (book), a 1997 science book by Michio Kaku
- York Vision, a student newspaper

=== Music ===
==== Albums ====
- Vision, a 2011 album by Alpha Blondy
- Vision, a 1994 album by Frank Duval
- Vision, a 2021 EP by Luminous
- Vision (EP), a 1993 EP by No Fun at All
- Vision (Shankar album), 1984, by L. Shankar
- The Vision (single album), a 2019 single album by WayV
- Visions (Melissa Aldana album), a 2019 album
- Visions, a 1999 EP by Atreyu
- Visions, a 1987 album by Dennis Brown
- Visions, a 1978 album by Clearlight
- Visions, a 2007 album by Disasteradio
- Visions (Paul Field album), a 1985 album
- Visions (Bunky Green album), a 1978 album
- Visions (Grant Green album), a 1971 album
- Visions (Grimes album), a 2012 album
- Visions (Haken album), a 2011 album
- Visions, a 2002 album by Dave Lee (DJ) as Jakatta
- Visions (Norah Jones album), a 2024 album
- Visions (Gladys Knight & the Pips album), a 1983 album
- Visions, a 2005 album by Libera
- Visions (Alice Merton album), a 2026 album
- Visions (Stratovarius album), a 1997 album
- Visions (Sun Ra album), a 1978 album by Sun Ra and Walt Dickerson
- Visions, a 2017 album by Touch Sensitive

==== Songs ====
- "Vision" (McCoy Tyner song), a 1969 jazz instrumental
- "Vision" (Qing Madi song), 2023
- "Vision", a song by As Blood Runs Black from their 2014 album Ground Zero
- "Vision", a song by Baroness from their 2005 EP Second
- "Vision", a song by Dreamcatcher from their 2022 EP Apocalypse: Follow Us
- "Vision", a song by (G)I-dle from their 2024 album 2
- "Vision", a song by Gotthard from their 1998 album Open
- "Vision", a song by Peter Hammill from his 1971 album Fool's Mate
- "Vision", a song by Psapp from their 2019 album Tourists
- "The Vision", an 1877 composition by Modest Mussorgsky
- "The Vision", a song by Exuma from his 1970 album Exuma
- "Visions" (Cliff Richard song), 1966
- "Visions" (Maroon 5 song), 2017
- "Visions", a song by Blossoms from their 2022 album Ribbon Around the Bomb
- "Visions", a song by Bring Me the Horizon from their 2010 album There Is a Hell Believe Me I've Seen It. There Is a Heaven Let's Keep It a Secret.
- "Visions", a song by Cut Copy from their 2008 album In Ghost Colours
- "Visions", a song by the Eagles from their 1975 album One of These Nights
- "Visions", a song by Hope for the Dying from their 2013 album Aletheia
- "Visions", a song by Stevie Wonder from his 1973 album Innervisions
- "Visions", by The Score, 2024
- "Visions (Don't Go)", a song by Bebe Rexha from her 2023 album Bebe

==== Groups ====
- Vision (Christian rock band), a 1980s Christian rock band

== Buildings ==
- Vision Brisbane, a planned skyscraper in Australia
- Vision Theatre, a theater in Los Angeles, California
- Vision Tower, a tower in Dubai

== Businesses and organisations ==
=== Businesses ===
- Vision (nightclub), in Chicago, Illinois, US
- Vision Airlines, based in North Las Vegas, Nevada, US
- Vision Fitness, a fitness equipment subsidiary of Johnson Health Tech
- Vision Group, a Ugandan media company (print, television and radio)
- Vision Street Wear, a footwear company

=== Other organizations ===
- Vision (trade union), a Swedish white-collar union
- Vision Australia, a blindness organisation
- Vision Montreal, a political party
- VISION movement, a political movement in Israel
- Vision Racing, an auto racing team
- Vision Vancouver, a political party
- Vision Zero, a road traffic safety project begun in Sweden

== Science and technology ==
- Apple Vision Pro, a mixed reality headset by Apple Inc. released in 2024
- Computer vision, a field dealing with how computers can be made to gain understanding from digital images or videos
- Machine vision, technology for imaging-based automatic inspection
- Sega Vision, a portable media player
- Visi On, an IBM operating environment
- Vision (game engine)
- Vision (IRC), an IRC client for BeOS
- Vision Mobile Browser
- Vision for Space Exploration, a U.S. government plan
- Visions (cookware), a brand of transparent stove top cookware

== Vehicles ==
=== Aircraft ===
- Cirrus Vision SF50, a single-engine very light jet aircraft
- Pro-Composites Vision, an amateur-built aircraft

=== Automotive ===
- Blue Bird Vision, a school bus
- Eagle Vision, a car

=== Ships ===
- USS Vision, any of several U.S. Navy ships
- MV Atlantic Vision, a ferry used in Canada
- Vision, a ship used by botanist Frederick Strange during the early days of Australian colonisation
- Vision (ship), a cruise ship operated by Tianjin Oriental
- Vision-class cruise ship, six ships built by Royal Caribbean International
  - Vision of the Seas, a cruise ship

== Other uses ==
- "The Vision", an 1832 revelation to Joseph Smith and Sidney Rigdon which established a degree of Universalist belief in the Latter Day Saint movement
- The Vision (professional wrestling), a stable in professional wrestling formed in 2025

== See also ==
- Visionary
