= Creative visualization (disambiguation) =

Creative visualization is the cognitive process of purposefully generating visual mental imagery.

Creative visualization may also refer to:

- Creative visualization (design), the creation of graphics and models to visualize products prior to production
- Creative visualization (New Age), in the context of New Age beliefs

== See also ==
- Visualization (disambiguation)
