= Carnival Sunshine =

Destiny-class cruise ship

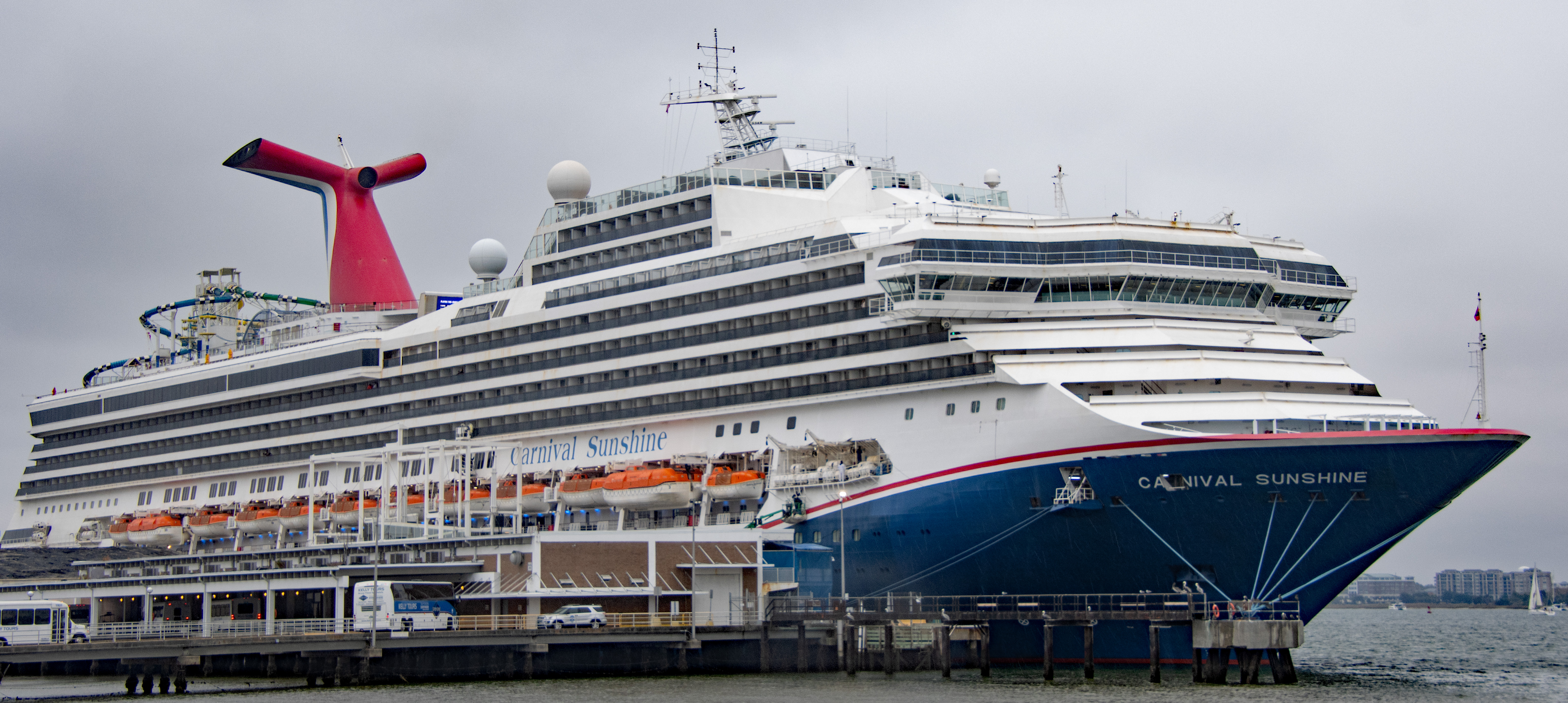
- Carnival Sunshine in Charleston, South Carolina on November 11, 2023

History
- Name: Carnival Destiny (24 November 1996 – 4 May 2013); Carnival Sunshine (5 May 2013 – present)
- Owner: Carnival Corporation
- Operator: Carnival Cruise Line
- Port of registry: Bahamas; Panama 24 May 2001
- Route: Bermuda, Bahamas, Caribbean
- Ordered: 1994
- Builder: Fincantieri, Monfalcone, Italy
- Cost: US$409 million
- Yard number: 5941
- Launched: 15 November 1995 as Carnival Destiny
- Maiden voyage: 24 November 1996 as Carnival Destiny; 5 May 2013 as Carnival Sunshine
- In service: 1996–present
- Renamed: Carnival Sunshine
- Refit: 2008, 2013, 2018, 2021, 2025
- Identification: Call sign: C6FN4; IMO number: 9070058; MMSI number: 308017000
- Status: In service

General characteristics (As built)
- Class & type: Destiny-class cruise ship
- Tonnage: 102,853 GT; 73,081 NT; 11.142 DWT
- Length: 272.2 m (893 ft)
- Beam: 35.5 m (116 ft)
- Draught: 8.3 m (27 ft)
- Decks: 12
- Deck clearance: 2,920 mm (115 in)
- Speed: 22.5 knots (41.7 km/h; 25.9 mph)
- Capacity: 2,642 passengers
- Crew: 1,150

General characteristics (After 2013 Refit)
- Class & type: Sunshine-class cruise ship
- Tonnage: 102,853 GT
- Length: 272.2 m (893 ft)
- Beam: 35.5 m (116 ft)
- Draught: 8.3 m (27 ft)
- Decks: 13
- Deck clearance: 2,920 mm (115 in)
- Speed: 21 knots (39 km/h; 24 mph)
- Capacity: 3,002 passengers
- Crew: 1,150
- Notes: Renamed Carnival Sunshine post 2013 refit.

Carnival Sunshine, formerly Carnival Destiny, is a cruise ship operated by Carnival Cruise Line. She debuted in 1996 with several size records. She was the first passenger ship ever built to exceed 100,000 gross tons, and was the world's largest passenger vessel built up to that time breaking the Queen Elizabeth's 54 year record, holding it until 1998. Built by Fincantieri at its Monfalcone shipyard in Friuli-Venezia Giulia, northern Italy, she was christened as Carnival Destiny in Venice, in November 1996 by Lin Arison, the wife of Carnival Cruise Line founder Ted Arison.

In 2013, she received a major refit and a rename, with sister ships Carnival Sunrise and Carnival Radiance following suit in 2019 and 2021 respectively. At a ceremony in New Orleans on 17 November 2013, she was formally renamed, with Lin Arison once again serving as her godmother.

Carnival Sunshine sailed seven night Eastern and Western Caribbean voyages from New Orleans until April 2014, when she repositioned to Port Canaveral, Florida. From Port Canaveral, she sailed 5 to 9 night Eastern Caribbean, Western Caribbean, and Southern Caribbean voyages.

During the Summer of 2016 and 2017, Sunshine sailed from New York, Charleston and Norfolk, alternating homeports. From these home ports, she sailed four and five night trips to Bermuda as well as her usual 6 to 8 night Eastern Caribbean sailings.

From May 2019 to January 2025, the ship was homeported full time in Charleston, South Carolina. She predominantly sailed 4 and 5 night cruises to the Bahamas. She also offered occasional 6, 7, and 8 night trips to the Eastern Caribbean. It was originally planned to sail to Cuba from Charleston but those plans were cancelled after the Cuban travel ban.

In February 2025, she repositioned to Norfolk, and is now offering six to nine day cruises to the Bahamas and Eastern Caribbean. This marks the first time that a ship has been homeported from the Port of Norfolk year-round.

== History ==
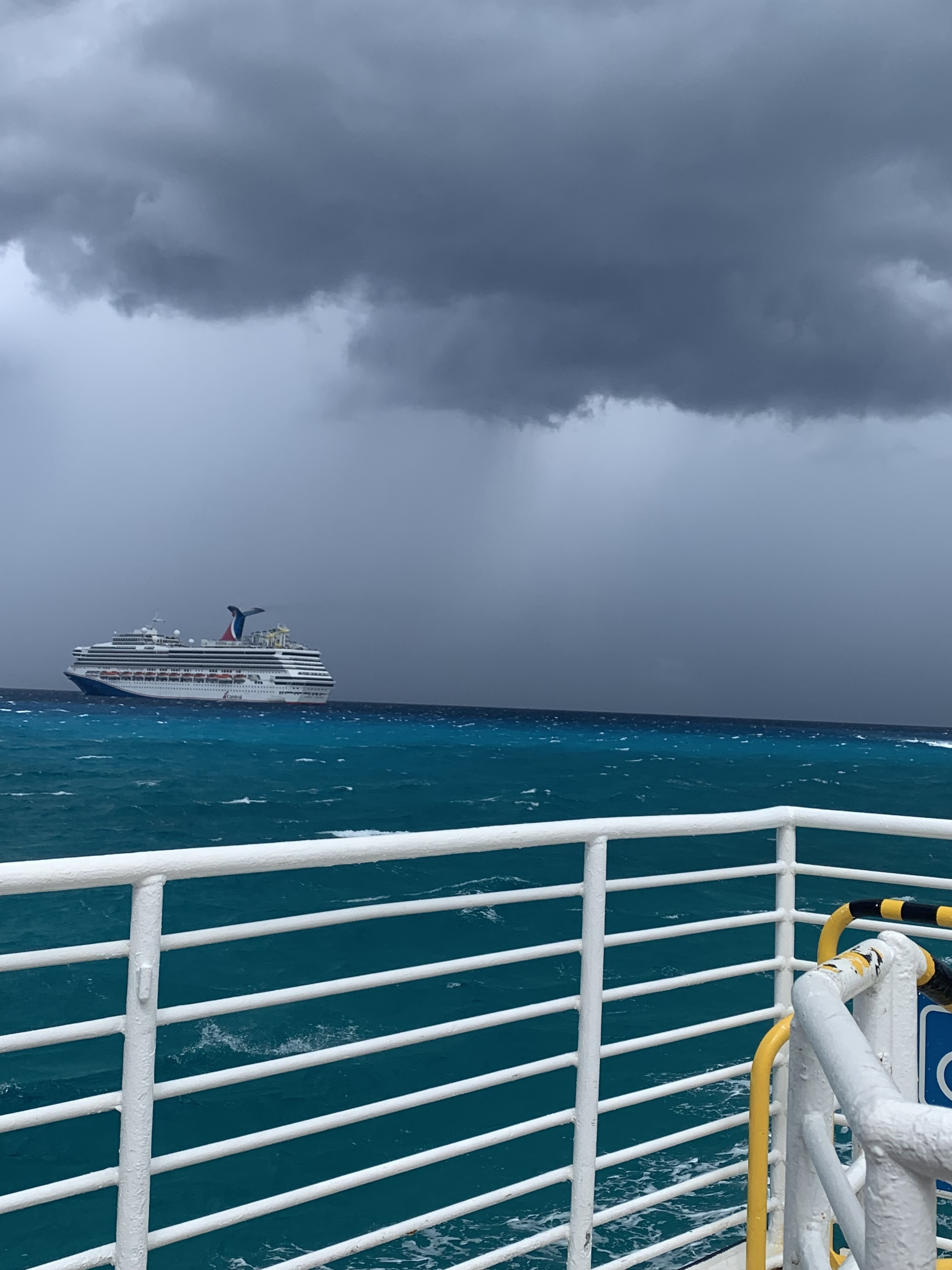
Carnival Sunshine as seen from a tender

On 6 March 2012, Carnival announced that Destiny would undergo a US$155-million dollar refit, and renaming of the ship as Carnival Sunshine. Carnival Destiny went into dry dock in Trieste, Italy in 2013 to be refitted and renamed Carnival Sunshine. The refitting, which was completed in May 2013, was delayed by a month to install new back-up generator systems. The ship was re-launched on 5 May 2013.

In May 2023, the ship suffered extensive damage in a storm. Some crew were evacuated from their cabins due to flooding, and the crew bar was destroyed.

In 2026 - thirty years after the debut - 65 crew members are still working for Carnival.

== Layout ==
Following a multi-million-dollar refurbishment in 2005, Carnival Destiny featured three pools, a variety of dining options, lounges, nightclubs, a casino and a spa. Carnival Destiny received more modifications when in drydock to fix a propulsion problem in 2010, including a movie screen on the Lido deck and cabin renovations.

The 2013 refit included a racing themed waterpark with one of the biggest slides in Carnival's fleet.

== Areas of operation ==
Other than an 18-day cruise across the Atlantic to position her for the refit in Italy, the ship has always operated from ports in the United States cruising primarily to Caribbean destinations. Carnival Sunshine formerly did three- to five-night voyages from Charleston that visited Nassau, Freeport, Half Moon Cay, and Princess Cays. She also participated in the fun ship meet up in March 2022 to commemorate Carnival's 50th anniversary. Since February 2025, Carnival Sunshine has sailed out of Norfolk, Virginia for year-round cruises to various ports in The Bahamas.
