= USCGC Vigorous =

United States Coast Guard cutter

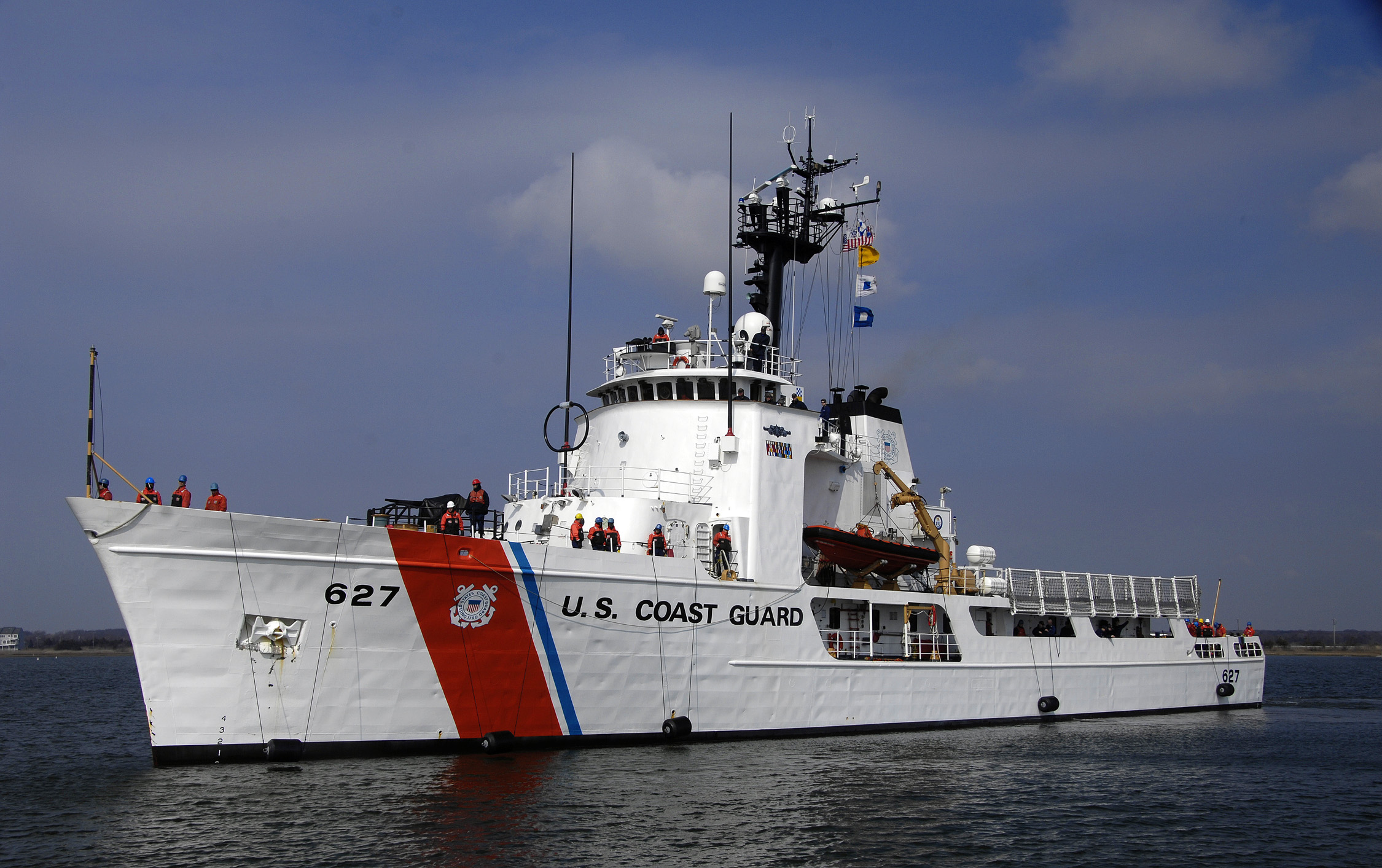
- USCGC Vigorous (WMEC-627)

History

United States
- Builder: American Ship Building Company, Lorain, Ohio
- Laid down: 10 November 1967
- Launched: 4 May 1968
- Acquired: 2 May 1969
- Commissioned: 2 May 1969
- Home port: Portsmouth, Virginia
- Identification: MMSI number: 367263000; Callsign: NQSP
- Motto: Paratus Gerere; Ready for War
- Status: Active

General characteristics
- Displacement: 1050 lt
- Length: 210 ft 6 in (64.16 m)
- Beam: 34 ft (10 m)
- Draught: 10 ft 6 in (3.20 m) max
- Propulsion: 2 x V16 2550 horsepower ALCO diesel engines
- Speed: max 18 knots; 2,700 mile range
- Range: cruise 14 knots; 6,100 mile range
- Complement: 12 officers, 63 enlisted
- Sensors & processing systems: 2 x AN/SPS-73/SINS
- Armament: 1 × Mk 38 25mm machine gun; 2 × M2HB .50 caliber machine gun
- Aircraft carried: HH-65 Dolphin

USCGC Vigorous (WMEC-627) is a United States Coast Guard Reliance Class medium endurance cutter.

== Service summary ==
Her keel was laid down by American Ship Building Company, Lorain, Ohio 10 November 1967 and she was launched 4 May 1968. Vigorous was commissioned 2 May 1969 and her current homeport is Portsmouth, Virginia.

Her initial homeport was in New London, Connecticut where she was moored at the United States Coast Guard Academy. She was decommissioned for modernization at the United States Coast Guard Yard in Curtis Bay, Maryland, in early 1992 and was recommissioned on 11 January 1993.

During the 2010 Caribbean Games in Mayaguez, Puerto Rico, the Vigorous maintained a security zone in Mayaguez harbor.

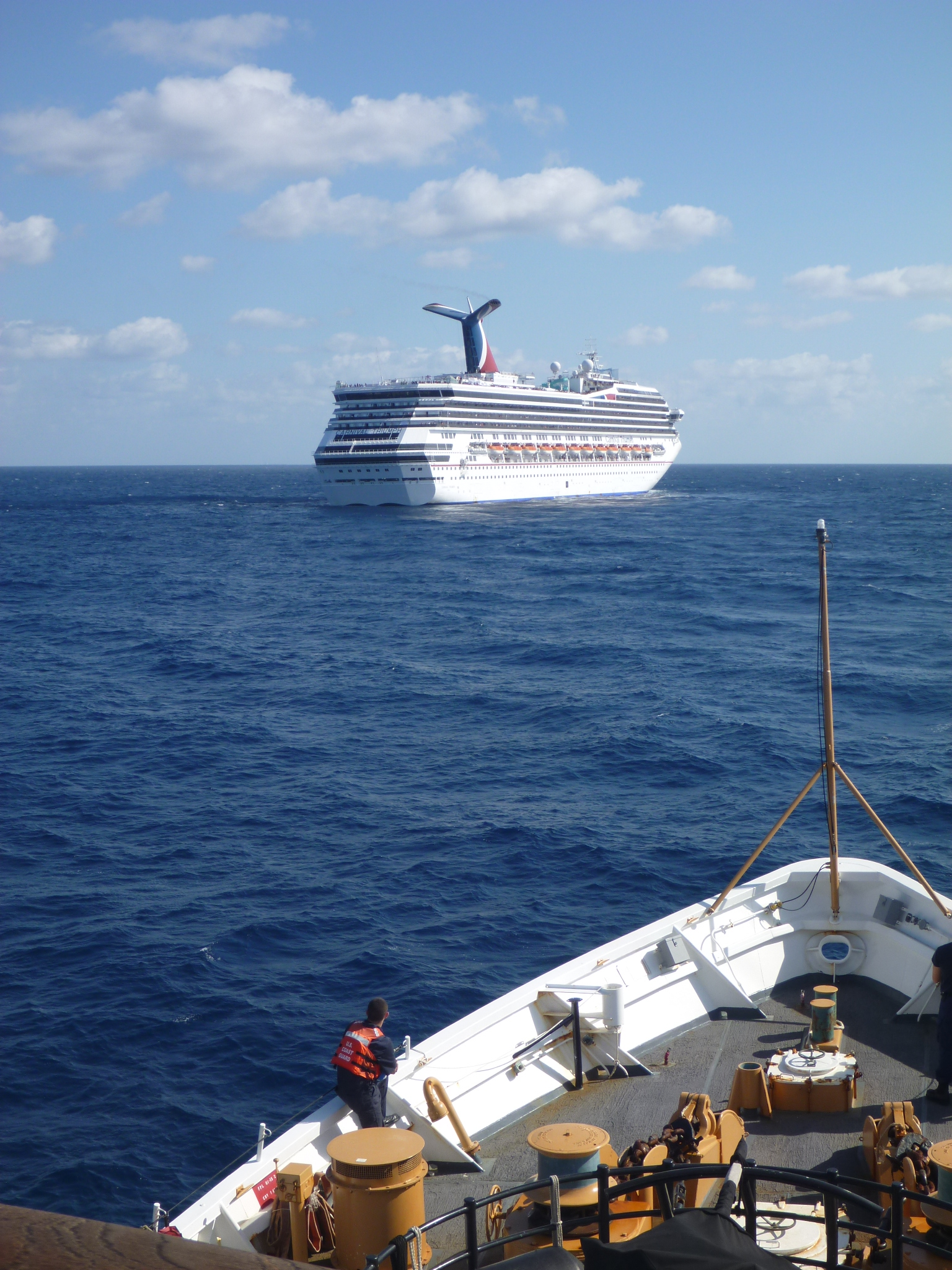
USCGC Vigorous stands by to assist the cruise ship Carnival Triumph in the Gulf of Mexico, Feb. 11, 2013.

On 11 February 2013, the Vigorous stood by the disabled 102,000-ton cruise ship Carnival Triumph adrift in the Gulf of Mexico waiting to be towed. On Sunday, 10 February 2013 at 5:30 a.m. CST, the Carnival Triumph suffered a fire in her aft engine room. Although the fire was automatically extinguished and there were no injuries to passengers or crew, it resulted in a loss of propulsion and power to all support systems. With 4,229 persons on board, raw sewage began to back up into the lower passenger deck areas. This caused the media to dub the event "The Poop Cruise." A Coast Guard supplied emergency generator was providing minimal electrical power, while the ship was adrift about 150 miles off the northern coast of the Yucatán Peninsula in the Gulf of Mexico. The ship was originally expected to be towed to the Mexican port of Progreso. However, after being carried north by currents while awaiting arrival of large, seagoing tugboats, she was towed to Mobile, Alabama instead. Vigorous escorted Carnival Triumph during her tow.

During May 2014, the Vigorous was spearheading the search for the Yacht Cheeki Rafiki one thousand miles east of Cape Cod, which went missing on a delivery voyage from Antigua to Southampton, England. The overturned hull of the capsized Cheeki Rafiki was found on the evening of 23 May 2014 with the keel broken off and the uninflated life raft inside the hull. All four sailors on board were presumed lost at sea.

== Awards ==
While in service, Vigorous has been awarded:

- Coast Guard Presidential Unit Citation
- United States Secretary of Transportation's Gold Medal for Outstanding Achievement
- 4 Coast Guard Unit Commendations
- 6 Coast Guard Meritorious Unit Commendations
- Meritorious Team Commendation
- Coast Guard Bicentennial Unit Commendation
- 15 Coast Guard "E" Ribbons
- 3 National Defense Service Medals
- Global War on Terrorism Service Medal
- 2 Humanitarian Service Medals
- Department of Transportation 9-11 Ribbon
- 2 Coast Guard Special Operations Service Ribbons
- 13 Coast Guard Sea Service Ribbons
