= Visualizer =

Visualizer or visualiser may refer to:

- Visualizer (advertising), or storyboard artist
- Visualizer (education), an image capture devices for displaying an object to a large audience
- Music visualizer, generating animated imagery based on a piece of music
- Visualizer, a barebones music video

== See also ==
- Visualization (disambiguation)
- Architectural illustrator
- Scientific visualization
- Software visualization
