= Carnival Radiance =

Destiny-class cruise ship

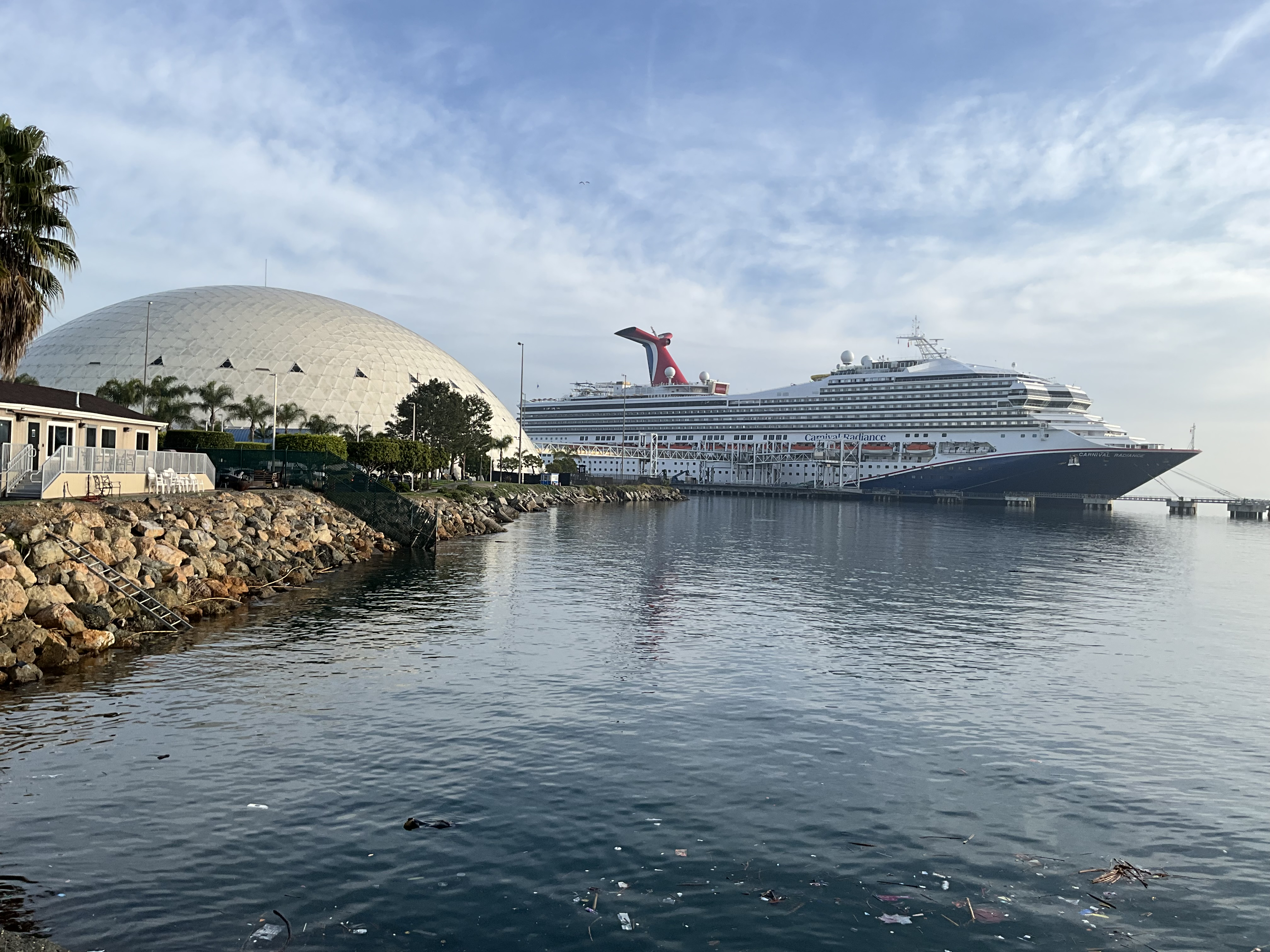
- Carnival Radiance docked in Long Beach, (Los Angeles County) California, USA wearing Carnival’s Blue Bow Livery from Carnival Mardi Gras on 18 December 2025

History
- Name: 2000–2021: Carnival Victory; 2021–present: Carnival Radiance
- Owner: Carnival Corporation
- Operator: Carnival Cruise Line
- Port of registry: Panama
- Ordered: 30 January 1997
- Builder: Fincantieri, Monfalcone, Italy
- Cost: US $410 million; US $200 million (2021 refurbishment)
- Laid down: 26 June 1998
- Launched: 31 December 1998
- Sponsored by: 16 September 2000 (Mary Frank, wife of Howard Frank, Carnival Corp. Vice Chairman); 12 December 2021 (Lucille O'Neal, mother of Carnival brand ambassador Shaquille O'Neal)
- Completed: 28 July 2000
- Maiden voyage: 15 October 2000; 13 December 2021 (Carnival Radiance)
- In service: October 2000–March 2020, December 2021
- Refit: 2021
- Home port: Long Beach, California
- Identification: IMO number: 9172648; Call sign 3FFL8; MMSI number: 355263000
- Status: In service
- Notes: Sister ship of Carnival Triumph (now Carnival Sunrise)

General characteristics
- Class & type: Destiny-class cruise ship
- Tonnage: 101,509 GT
- Length: 893 ft (272 m)
- Beam: 116 ft (35 m)
- Draft: 27 ft (8.2 m)
- Decks: 13 decks
- Installed power: 34,000 kW (46,000 hp)
- Propulsion: Diesel-electric; two controllable pitch propellers (17.6 MW each)
- Speed: 21 knots (39 km/h; 24 mph)
- Capacity: 2,764 passenger (double occupancy), max 3,470 (with all berths filled)
- Crew: 1,100

Carnival Radiance (formerly Carnival Victory) is a Destiny-class cruise ship operated by Carnival Cruise Line. Ordered by Carnival in 1997, the 101,509 GT vessel was the third Destiny-class cruise ship to join the fleet after her debut in 2000 and became one of the largest cruise ships of her era. In 2021, she was renamed Carnival Radiance after a US$200 million refit was completed in October and she commenced service under her new name in December.

== Construction ==
Carnival Victory was built by Italian shipbuilder Fincantieri at its Monfalcone shipyard in Friuli-Venezia Giulia. She was launched on 31 December 1998 and later christened by Mary Frank, wife of Howard Frank, the then vice-chairman of Carnival. At the time of her launch, she was one of the largest cruise ships of her era.

In October 2018, Carnival announced that Carnival Victory would undergo a large-scale renovation in 2020 to complete the final phase of Carnival's fleet renovation program, after which the vessel would be renamed Carnival Radiance. The vessel was originally scheduled to begin the $200 million dry dock in Cádiz, Spain in March 2020 but the refit was postponed into the following year after the COVID-19 pandemic paused shipyard operations at the Navantia shipyard. The ship was officially renamed Carnival Radiance in September 2021 amid the continued renovation and left Cádiz in mid-October on a seven-week trip through the Panama Canal to reach her new homeport of Long Beach, California. In November, Carnival named Lucille O'Neal, mother of Carnival's brand ambassador, Shaquille O'Neal, as the ship's new godmother, and she christened the vessel on 12 December in Long Beach, after which the ship commenced operations the following day with a four-day inaugural sailing to Ensenada, Mexico and Catalina Island.

== Design ==
=== Machinery ===
The ship is powered by four GMT Sulzer 16 ZAV and two GMT Sulzer 12 ZAV diesel-electric engines driving two controllable pitch propellers. She is fitted with two rudders (which can be individually controlled) as well as stabilizers.

=== Layout ===
Carnival Victory is themed by American designer and architect Joseph Farcus to depict the different oceans and seas of the world.

Like Carnival Sunrise (formerly Carnival Triumph), her architecture is different from sister ship Carnival Sunshine (formerly Carnival Destiny). The two newer vessels have additional balcony cabins on their Lido decks and various changes to placement and architecture of public areas. There are three large pools and a 214-foot-long (65 m) waterslide.

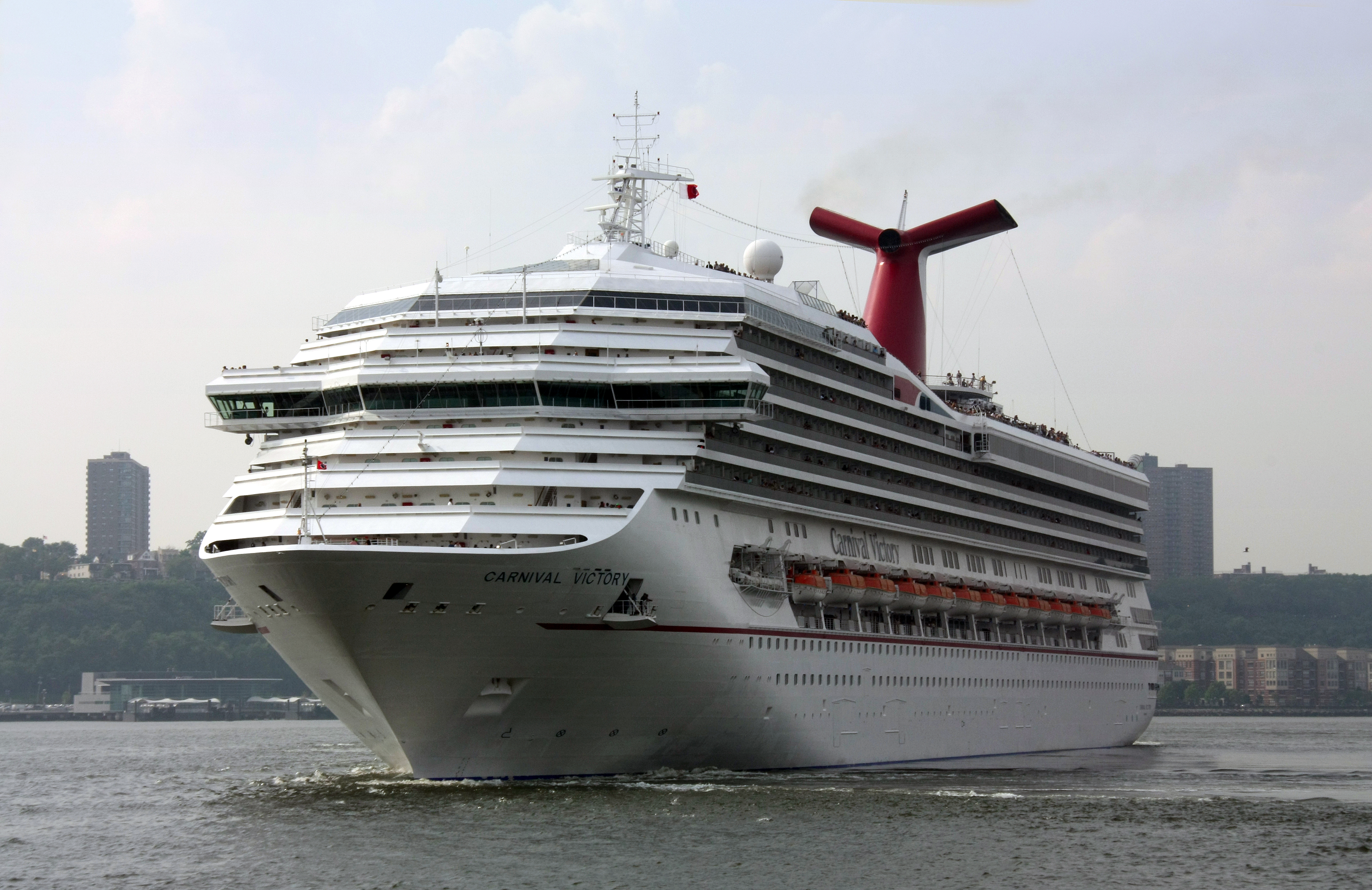
Carnival Radiance as Carnival Victory departs New York City, New York on 23 June 2008

She has a nine-deck atrium with four glass elevators, a two-deck lounge with seating for 747, and a total capacity of 3,400 passengers and 1,100 crew members.

== Service history ==
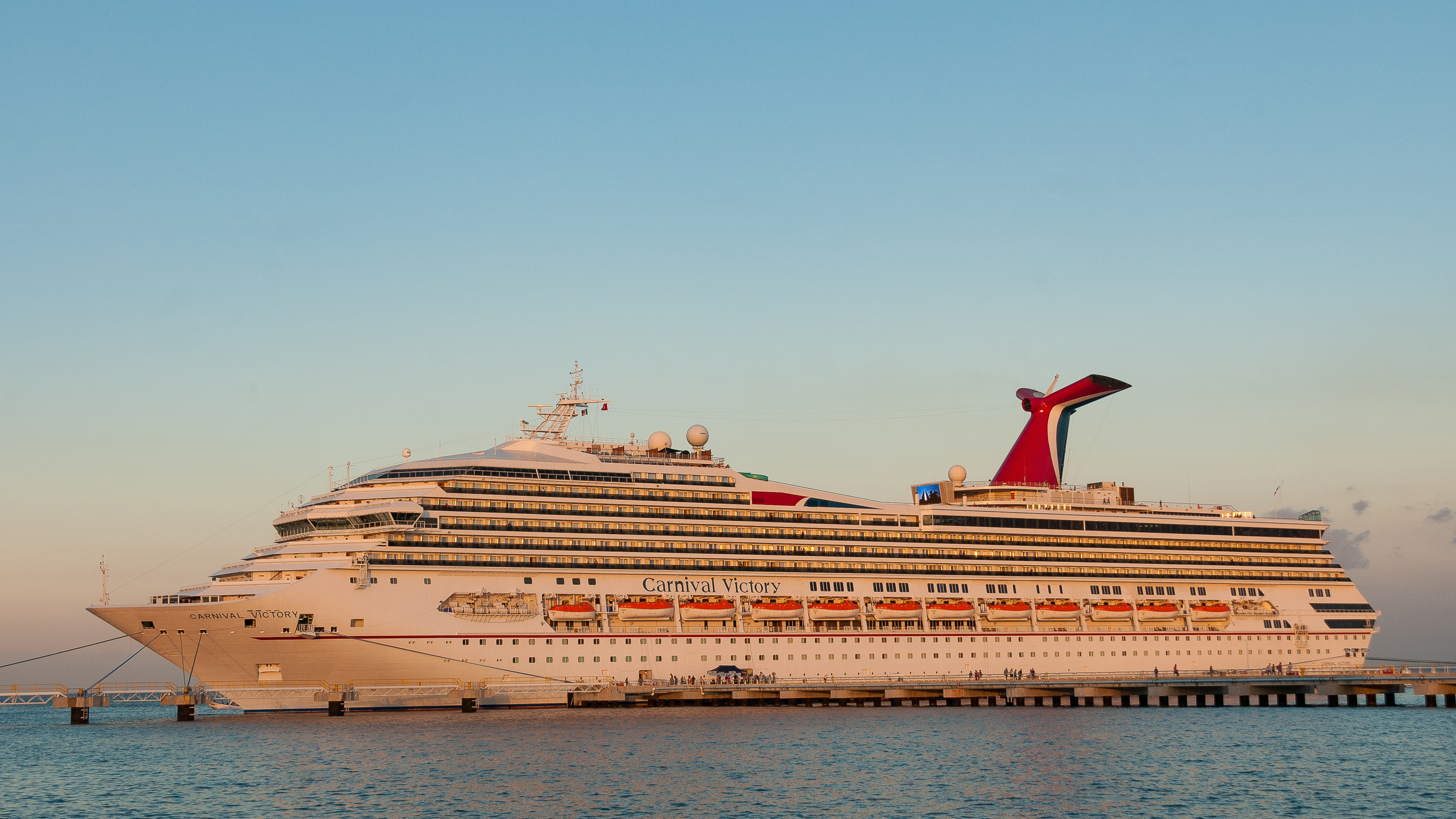
Carnival Radiance as Carnival Victory docked in Cozumel, Mexico on 26 December 2017

Throughout her service, Carnival Victory was based at Miami, Florida, sailing year-round on alternating three-night and four-night cruises to Caribbean destinations. In July 2020, Carnival announced that Carnival Radiance's new homeport would become Long Beach instead of Port Canaveral or Galveston, Texas, which were previously announced in 2018 and 2019, respectively. Following her debut in December 2021, she began sailing year-round on alternating three-night and four-night cruises to Catalina Island and Ensenada.

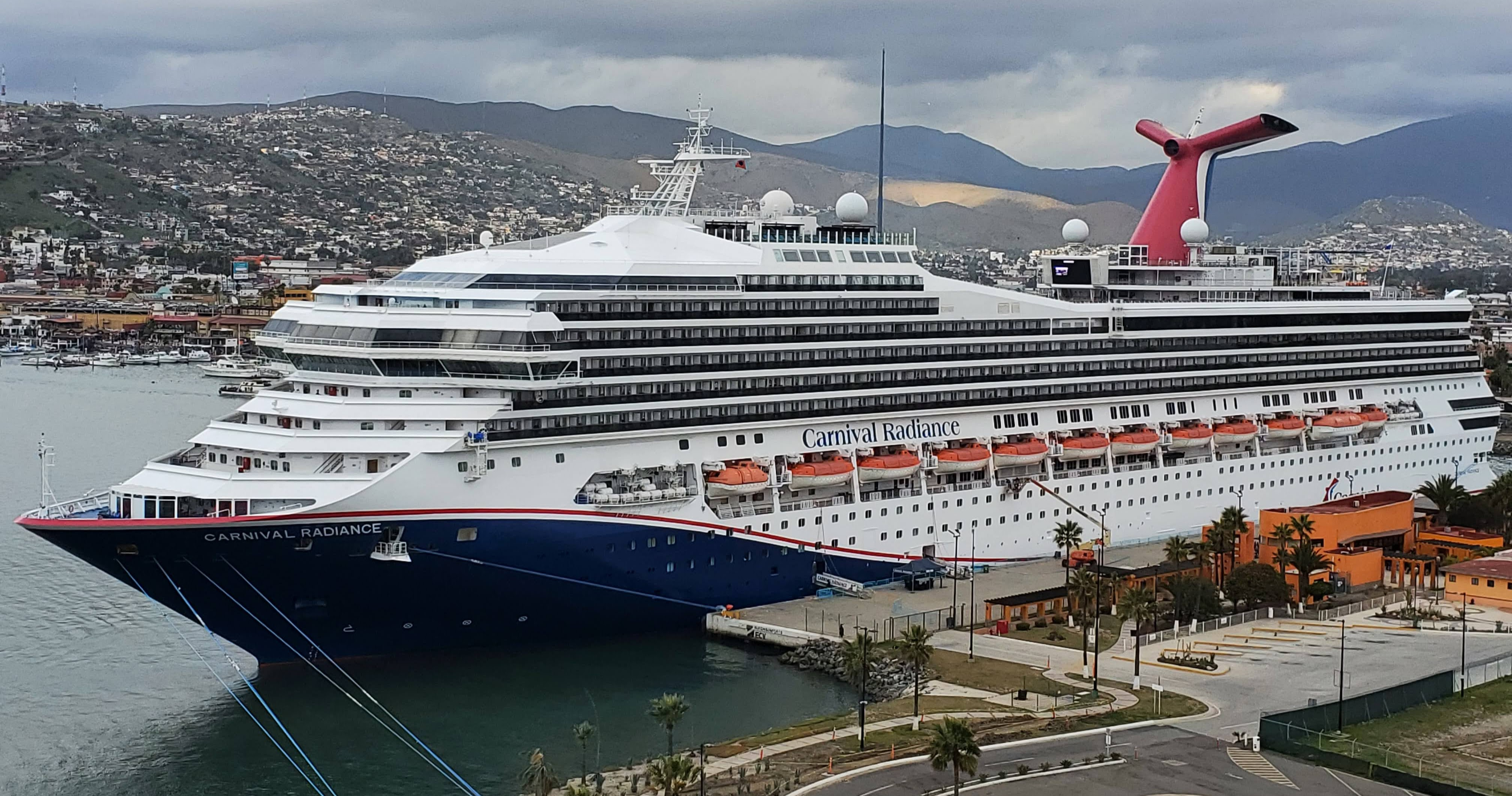
Carnival Radiance at Ensenada, Mexico on 29 January 2023
