= Hi viz =

Hi viz may refer to:

- High-visibility clothing
- Hi Viz (album), by The Presets, 2018
- Hi Viz, a precision railroading system
- HI VIZ® fiber optic sight on the Smith & Wesson Model 500 revolver
