= Visualization =

Visualization or visualisation may refer to:

- Visualization (graphics), the physical or imagining creation of images, diagrams, or animations to communicate a message
- Data and information visualization, the practice of creating visual representations of complex data and information
- Music visualization, animated imagery based on a piece of music
- Mental image, the experience of images without the relevant external stimuli
- "Visualization", a song by Blank Banshee on the 2012 album Blank Banshee 0

== See also ==
- Creative visualization (disambiguation)
- Visualizer (disambiguation)
- Graphics
- List of graphical methods, various forms of visualization
- Guided imagery, a mind-body intervention by a trained practitioner
- Illustration, a decoration, interpretation or visual explanation of a text, concept or process
- Image, an artifact that depicts visual perception, such as a photograph or other picture
- Infographics
