= Vis-à-vis =

Vis-à-vis may refer to:

- Vis-à-vis, a French expression in English, literally "face to face (with)", meaning in comparison with or in relation to
- Vis-à-vis (album), by Karol Mikloš, 2002
- Vis-à-vis (carriage), a type of horse-drawn carriage
- Vis a vis (TV series), a Spanish TV series
- "Vis à Vis" (Star Trek: Voyager), an episode of the TV series

== See also ==
- Viz (disambiguation)
