= Sunshine-class cruise ship =

Class of cruise ships

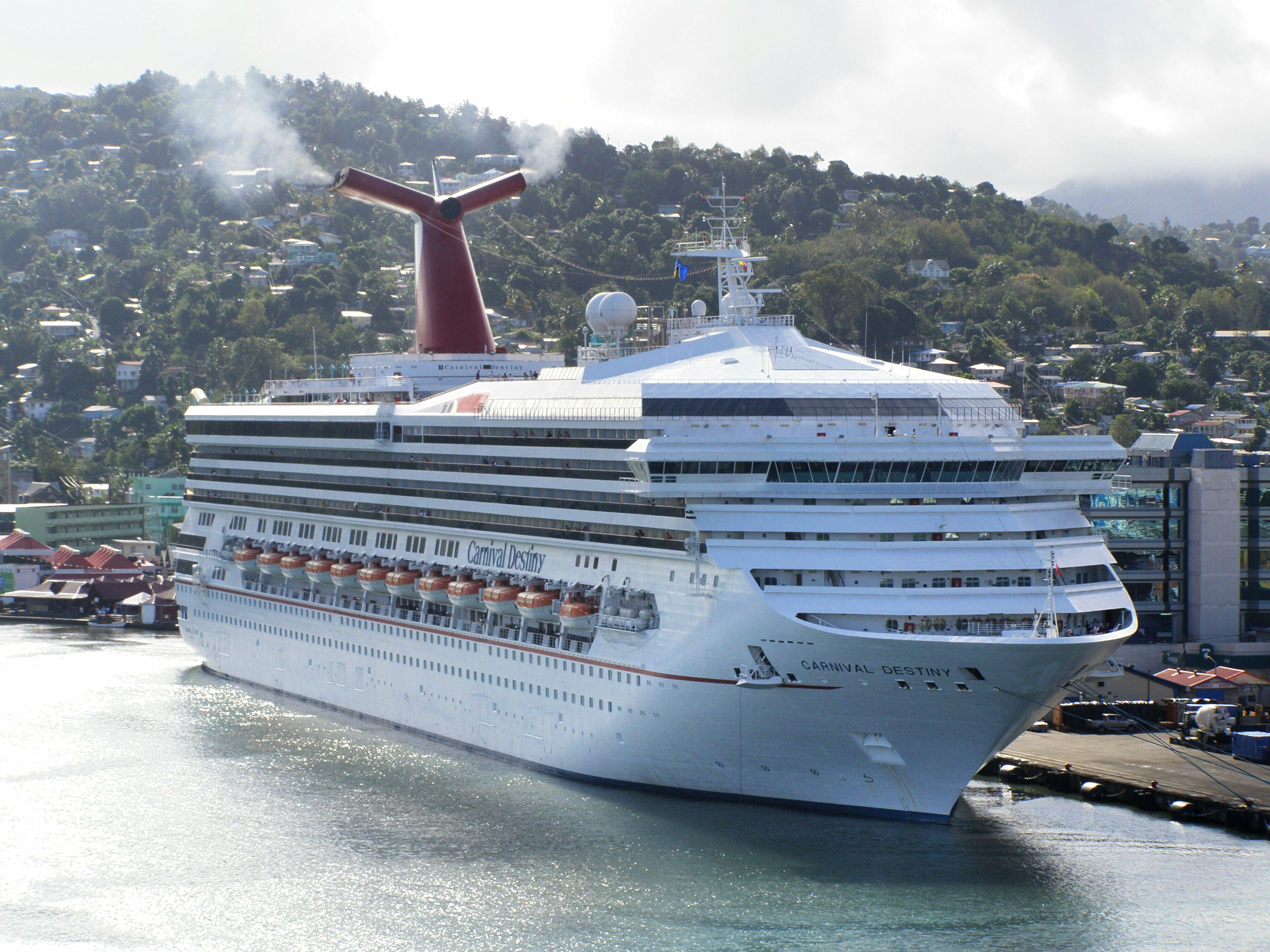
- Carnival Destiny at Castries, St. Lucia, in April 2007

Class overview
- Builders: Fincantieri
- Operators: Carnival Cruise Line (1996–present); Costa Cruises (2003–2026); Tianjin Orient International Cruise Line. (2025-present); Margaritaville at Sea (2026–present)
- Preceded by: Carnival Cruise Line: Fantasy class; Costa Cruises: Spirit class
- Succeeded by: Carnival Cruise Line: Dream class; Costa Cruises: Concordia class
- Built: 1996–2004
- In service: 1996–present
- Completed: 5
- Active: 5

General characteristics
- Type: Cruise ship
- Tonnage: 101,509–102,853 GT
- Length: 893 ft (272 m)
- Beam: 116 ft (35 m)
- Decks: 13
- Speed: 21 knots (39 km/h; 24 mph)
- Capacity: 2,642 passengers
- Crew: 1,040

The Sunshine class is a class of cruise ships owned by Carnival Cruise Line. The class was formerly known as the Destiny class until 2013 when Carnival Destiny was renamed Carnival Sunshine. This transformation continued with sister ships Carnival Triumph in 2019 and Carnival Victory in 2021.

== History ==
Carnival Destiny was launched in 1996 as the first in Carnival Cruise Line's Destiny class of ships. When launched it held the distinction as the world's largest passenger ship as well as the first passenger ship to be built over 100,000 GT. A sister ship, Carnival Triumph, launched in 1999 and was followed by Carnival Victory in 2000. Though similar to Carnival Destiny, Carnival Triumph and Carnival Victory were larger, each containing an additional passenger deck and additional cabins. As a result, both stood apart from the Destiny class and were ultimately classified as Triumph-class ships. Carnival Cruise Line and Costa Cruises would build larger variations based on the Destiny-class ships in the years that followed.

In 2013, Carnival began a series of dry-docks which transformed its three ships, Carnival Destiny, Carnival Triumph, and Carnival Victory, almost entirely, resulting in name changes for all three after the refits were completed. As a result, Carnival now collectively refers to these ships as the Sunshine class.

== Sunshine/Fortuna class ==
Ship	Year built	Sailed for Carnival	Gross tonnage	Homeports	Flag	Notes	Image
Sunshine class
Carnival Sunshine	1996	1996–present	102,853 GT	Norfolk, Virginia Galveston, Texas	Bahamas	Originally sailed as Carnival Destiny 1996–2013. The ship underwent a major refit in 2013 to become Carnival Sunshine. World's largest passenger ship (measured by gross tonnage), when built. First cruise ship over 100,000 GT. Currently the oldest ship in the Carnival fleet following the retirement of Carnival Ecstasy in October 2022.	
Carnival Sunrise	1999	1999–present	101,509 GT	Miami, Florida	Bahamas	Originally sailed as Carnival Triumph 1999–2019. The ship underwent a major refit in 2019 to become Carnival Sunrise. On February 14, 2013, the ship was towed to Mobile, Alabama for repairs after an engine room fire and resumed service on June 13, 2013, four months after being out of service.	
Carnival Radiance	2000	2000–present	101,509 GT	Long Beach, California	Panama	Originally sailed as Carnival Victory 2000–2020. After being delayed for over a year, her refit was completed in October 2021, which included receiving the new livery first seen on Mardi Gras.	
Fortuna class
Margaritaville at Sea Beachcomber	2003	2003–present	102,587	Miami, Florida	Italy	Similar to the former Carnival Destiny, Carnival Triumph, and Carnival Victory.	
Vision	2004	2004–2023	102,587	Piraeus-Athens, Greece	Bermuda	Similar to the former Carnival Destiny, Carnival Triumph, and Carnival Victory	
