= Idiom =

Phrase with a non-literal meaning

An idiom is a phrase or expression that largely or exclusively carries a figurative or non-literal meaning, rather than making any literal sense. Categorized as formulaic language, an idiomatic expression's meaning is different from the literal meanings of each word inside it.

Idioms occur frequently in all languages. In English alone there are an estimated twenty-five thousand idiomatic expressions. Some well known idioms in English are "spill the beans" (meaning "reveal secret information"), "it's raining cats and dogs" (meaning "it's raining intensely"), and "break a leg" (meaning "good luck").

== Derivations ==
Many idiomatic expressions were meant literally in their original use, but occasionally the attribution of the literal meaning changed and the phrase itself grew away from its original roots—typically leading to a folk etymology. For instance, the phrase "spill the beans" (meaning to reveal a secret) is first attested in 1919, but has been said to originate from an ancient method of voting by depositing beans in jars, which could be spilled, prematurely revealing the results.

Other idioms are deliberately figurative. For example, break a leg is an expression commonly said to wish a person good luck just prior to their giving a performance or presentation, which apparently wishes injury on them.

== Compositionality ==
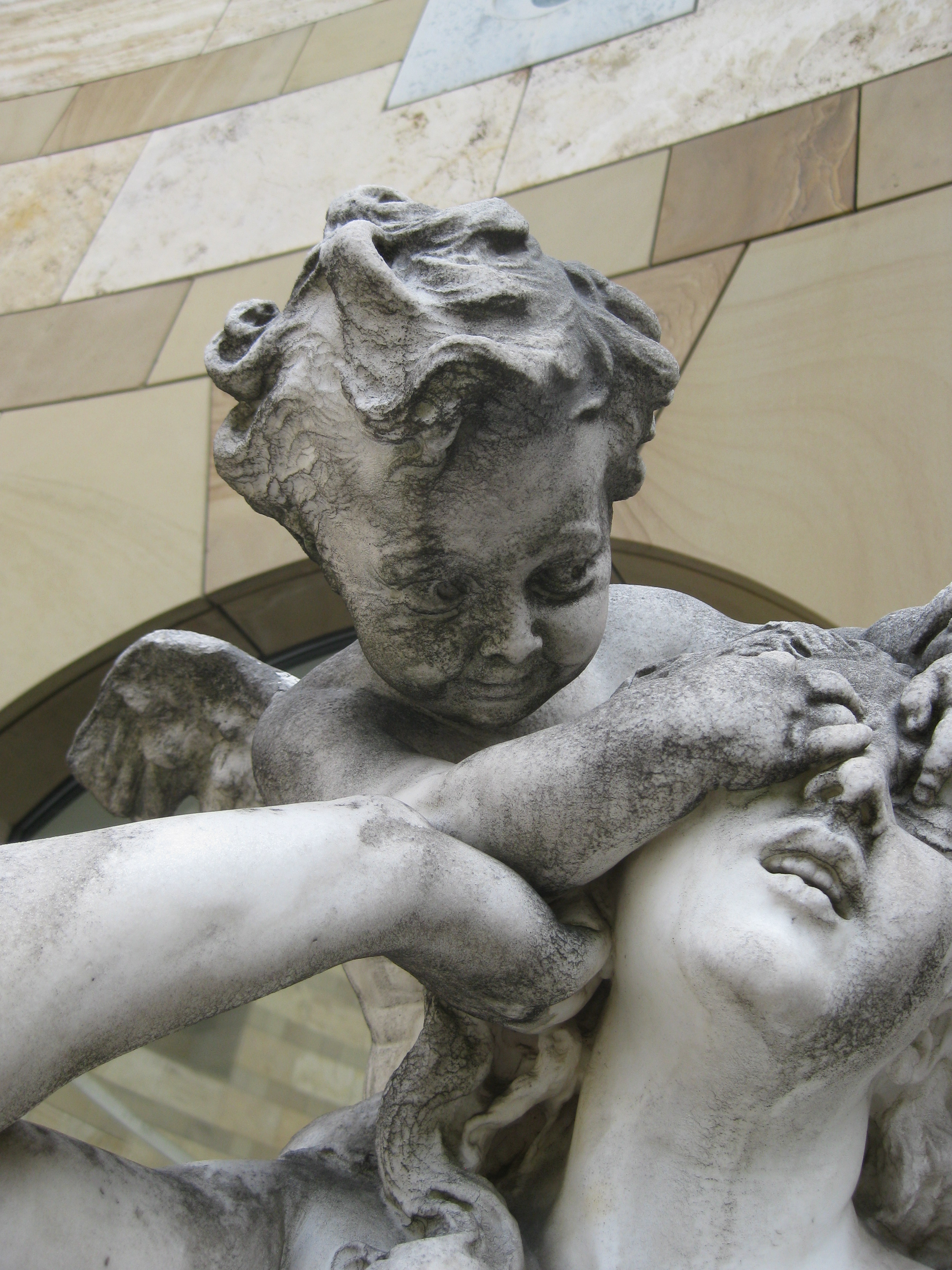
Love is blind—an idiom meaning a person who is in love can see no faults or imperfections in the person whom they love

In linguistics, idioms are usually presumed to be figures of speech contradicting the principle of compositionality. That compositionality is the key notion for the analysis of idioms is emphasized in most accounts of idioms. This principle states that the meaning of a whole should be constructed from the meanings of the parts that make up the whole.

For example, if the phrase "Fred kicked the bucket" is understood compositionally, it means that Fred has literally kicked an actual, physical bucket. The idiomatic reading, however, is non-compositional: it means that Fred has died. Arriving at the idiomatic reading from the literal reading is unlikely for most speakers. What this means is that the idiomatic reading is, rather, stored as a single lexical item that is now largely independent of the literal reading.

In phraseology, idioms are defined as a sub-type of phraseme, the meaning of which is not the regular sum of the meanings of its component parts. John Saeed defines an idiom as collocated words that became affixed to each other until metamorphosing into a fossilised term. This collocation of words redefines each component word in the word-group and becomes an idiomatic expression. Idioms usually do not translate well; in some cases, when an idiom is translated directly word-for-word into another language, either its meaning is changed or it is meaningless.

When two or three words are conventionally used together in a particular sequence, they form an irreversible binomial. For example, a person may be left high and dry, but never left dry and high. Not all irreversible binomials are idioms, however: chips and dip is irreversible, but its meaning is straightforwardly derived from its components.

== Mobility ==
Idioms possess varying degrees of mobility. Whereas some idioms are used only in a routine form, others can undergo syntactic modifications such as passivization, raising constructions, and clefting, demonstrating separable constituencies within the idiom. Mobile idioms, allowing such movement, maintain their idiomatic meaning where fixed idioms do not:

Mobile
I spilled the beans on our project. → The beans were spilled on our project. (valid)
Fixed
The old man kicked the bucket. → *The bucket was kicked (by the old man). (confusing)

Many fixed idioms lack semantic composition, meaning that the idiom contains the semantic role of a verb, but not of any object. This is true of kick the bucket, which means die. By contrast, the semantically composite idiom spill the beans, meaning reveal a secret, contains both a semantic verb and object, reveal and secret. Semantically composite idioms have a syntactic similarity between their surface and semantic forms.

The types of movement allowed for certain idioms also relate to the degree to which the literal reading of the idiom has a connection to its idiomatic meaning. This is referred to as motivation or transparency. While most idioms that do not display semantic composition generally do not allow non-adjectival modification, those that are also motivated allow lexical substitution. For example, oil the wheels and grease the wheels allow variation for nouns that elicit a similar literal meaning. These types of changes can occur only when speakers can easily recognize a connection between what the idiom is meant to express and its literal meaning, thus an idiom like kick the bucket cannot occur as kick the pot.

From the perspective of dependency grammar, idioms are represented as a catena which cannot be interrupted by non-idiomatic content. Although syntactic modifications introduce disruptions to the idiomatic structure, this continuity is only required for idioms as lexical entries.

Certain idioms, allowing unrestricted syntactic modification, can be said to be metaphors. Expressions such as jump on the bandwagon, pull strings, and draw the line all represent their meaning independently in their verbs and objects, making them compositional. In the idiom jump on the bandwagon, jump on involves joining something and a 'bandwagon' can refer to a collective cause, regardless of context.

== Translation ==
A word-by-word translation of an opaque idiom will most likely not convey the same meaning in other languages. The English idiom kick the bucket has a variety of equivalents in other languages, such as kopnąć w kalendarz ("kick the calendar") in Polish, casser sa pipe ("to break one's pipe") in French and tirare le cuoia ("pulling the leathers") in Italian.

Some idioms are transparent. Much of their meaning gets through if they are taken (or translated) literally. For example, lay one's cards on the table meaning to reveal previously unknown intentions or to reveal a secret. Transparency is a matter of degree; spill the beans (to let secret information become known) and leave no stone unturned (to do everything possible in order to achieve or find something) are not entirely literally interpretable but involve only a slight metaphorical broadening. Another category of idioms is a word having several meanings, sometimes simultaneously, sometimes discerned from the context of its usage. This is seen in the (mostly uninflected) English language in polysemes, the common use of the same word for an activity, for those engaged in it, for the product used, for the place or time of an activity, and sometimes for a verb.

Idioms tend to confuse those unfamiliar with them; students of a new language must learn its idiomatic expressions as vocabulary. Many natural language words have idiomatic origins but are assimilated and so lose their figurative senses. For example, in Portuguese, the expression saber de coração 'to know by heart', with the same meaning as in English, was shortened to 'saber de cor', and, later, to the verb decorar, meaning memorize.

In 2015, TED collected 40 examples of bizarre idioms that cannot be translated literally. They include the Swedish saying "to slide in on a shrimp sandwich", which refers those who did not have to work to get where they are.

Conversely, idioms may be shared between multiple languages. For example, the Arabic phrase في نفس المركب (fi nafs al-markeb) is translated as "in the same boat", and it carries the same figurative meaning as the equivalent idiom in English. Another example would be the Japanese 一石二鳥 (isseki ni chō), which is translated as "one stone, two birds". This is analogous to "to kill two birds with one stone" in English.

According to the German linguist Elizabeth Piirainen, the idiom "to get on one's nerves" has the same figurative meaning in 57 European languages. She also says that the phrase "to shed crocodile tears", meaning to express insincere sorrow, is similarly widespread in European languages but is also used in Arabic, Swahili, Persian, Chinese, Vietnamese, Mongolian, and several others.

The origin of cross-language idioms is uncertain. One theory is that cross-language idioms are a language contact phenomenon, resulting from a word-for-word translation called a calque. Piirainen says that may happen as a result of lingua franca usage in which speakers incorporate expressions from their own native tongue, which exposes them to speakers of other languages. Other theories suggest they come from a shared ancestor-language or that humans are naturally predisposed to develop certain metaphors.

== Non-compositionality ==
The non-compositionality of meaning of idioms challenges theories of syntax. The fixed words of many idioms do not qualify as constituents in any sense. For example:

How do we get to the bottom of this situation?

The fixed words of this idiom (in bold) do not form a constituent in any theory's analysis of syntactic structure because the object of the preposition (here this situation) is not part of the idiom (but rather it is an argument of the idiom). One can know that it is not part of the idiom because it is variable; for example, How do we get to the bottom of this situation / the claim / the phenomenon / her statement / etc. What this means is that theories of syntax that take the constituent to be the fundamental unit of syntactic analysis are challenged. The manner in which units of meaning are assigned to units of syntax remains unclear. This problem has motivated a tremendous amount of discussion and debate in linguistics circles and it is a primary motivator behind the Construction Grammar framework.

A relatively recent development in the syntactic analysis of idioms departs from a constituent-based account of syntactic structure, preferring instead the catena-based account. The catena unit was introduced to linguistics by William O'Grady in 1998. Any word or any combination of words that are linked together by dependencies qualifies as a catena. The words constituting idioms are stored as catenae in the lexicon, and as such, they are concrete units of syntax. The dependency grammar trees of a few sentences containing non-constituent idioms illustrate the point:

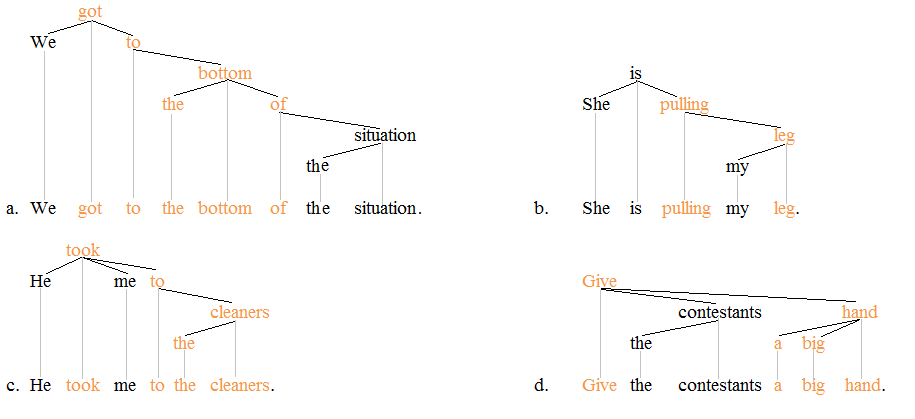

The fixed words of the idiom (in orange) in each case are linked together by dependencies; they form a catena. The material that is outside of the idiom (in normal black script) is not part of the idiom. The following two trees illustrate proverbs:

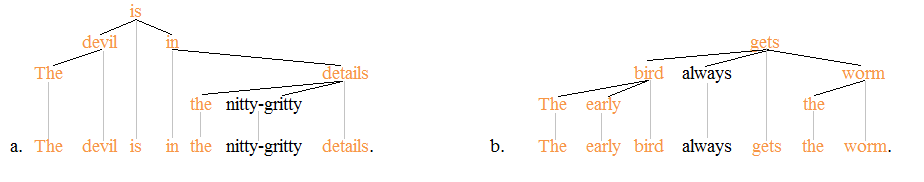

The fixed words of the proverbs (in orange) again form a catena each time. The adjective nitty-gritty and the adverb always are not part of the respective proverb and their appearance does not interrupt the fixed words of the proverb. A caveat concerning the catena-based analysis of idioms concerns their status in the lexicon. Idioms are lexical items, which means they are stored as catenae in the lexicon. In the actual syntax, however, some idioms can be broken up by various functional constructions.

The catena-based analysis of idioms provides a basis for an understanding of meaning compositionality. The Principle of Compositionality can in fact be maintained. Units of meaning are being assigned to catenae, whereby many of these catenae are not constituents.

Various studies have investigated methods to develop the ability to interpret idioms in children with various diagnoses including autism, moderate learning difficulties, developmental language disorder and typically developing weak readers.

== See also ==
- Catena (linguistics)
- Chengyu
- Cliché
- Collocation
- Comprehension of idioms
- English-language idioms
- Figure of speech
- Metaphor
- Multiword expression
- Phrasal verb
- Principle of compositionality
- Rhetorical device
