= Vis, Bulgaria =

Vis Вис
- Village
- Location of Vis
- Country: Bulgaria
- Province: Haskovo Province
- Municipality: Ivaylovgrad

Population (2019)
  - Total: 5
- Time zone: UTC+2 (EET)
  - Summer (DST): UTC+3 (EEST)
- Postal code: 6591

Vis (Bulgarian: Вис) is a village in the municipality of Ivaylovgrad, in Haskovo Province, in southern Bulgaria.

== Geography ==
The village of Vis is located in a mountainous area.
