= Vis (surname) =

Vis is a Dutch metonymic occupational surname. Vis means "fish" and referred to a fisherman. Variant forms are De Vis ("the fish"), De Visch, and Visch.

People with this surname include:

- Caroline Vis (born 1970), Dutch tennis player
- Fiderd Vis (born 1981), Aruban judoka
- Jacob Vis (born 1940), Dutch novelist
- Jan Vis (1933–2011), Dutch journalist, legal scholar, and politician
- Judith Vis (born 1980), Dutch hurdler and heptathlete
- Lucas Vis (born 1947), Dutch conductor and composer
- Marja Vis (born 1977), Dutch speed skater
- Rudi Vis (1941–2010), Dutch-born British politician and MP
- Russell Vis (1900–1990), American wrestler
- Willem Cornelis Vis (1924–1993), Dutch jurist and expert in international commercial transactions

De Vis

- Charles Walter De Vis (1829–1915), English zoologist and botanist active in Australia

(De) Visch

- Charles de Visch (1596–1666), Flemish abbot and bibliographer
- Henk Visch (born 1950), Dutch sculptor
- Matthias de Visch (1701–1765), Flemish historical and portrait painter
- Soraya de Visch Eijbergen (born 1993), Dutch badminton player
