= Margaritaville at Sea Beachcomber =

Cruise ship for Costa Crociere

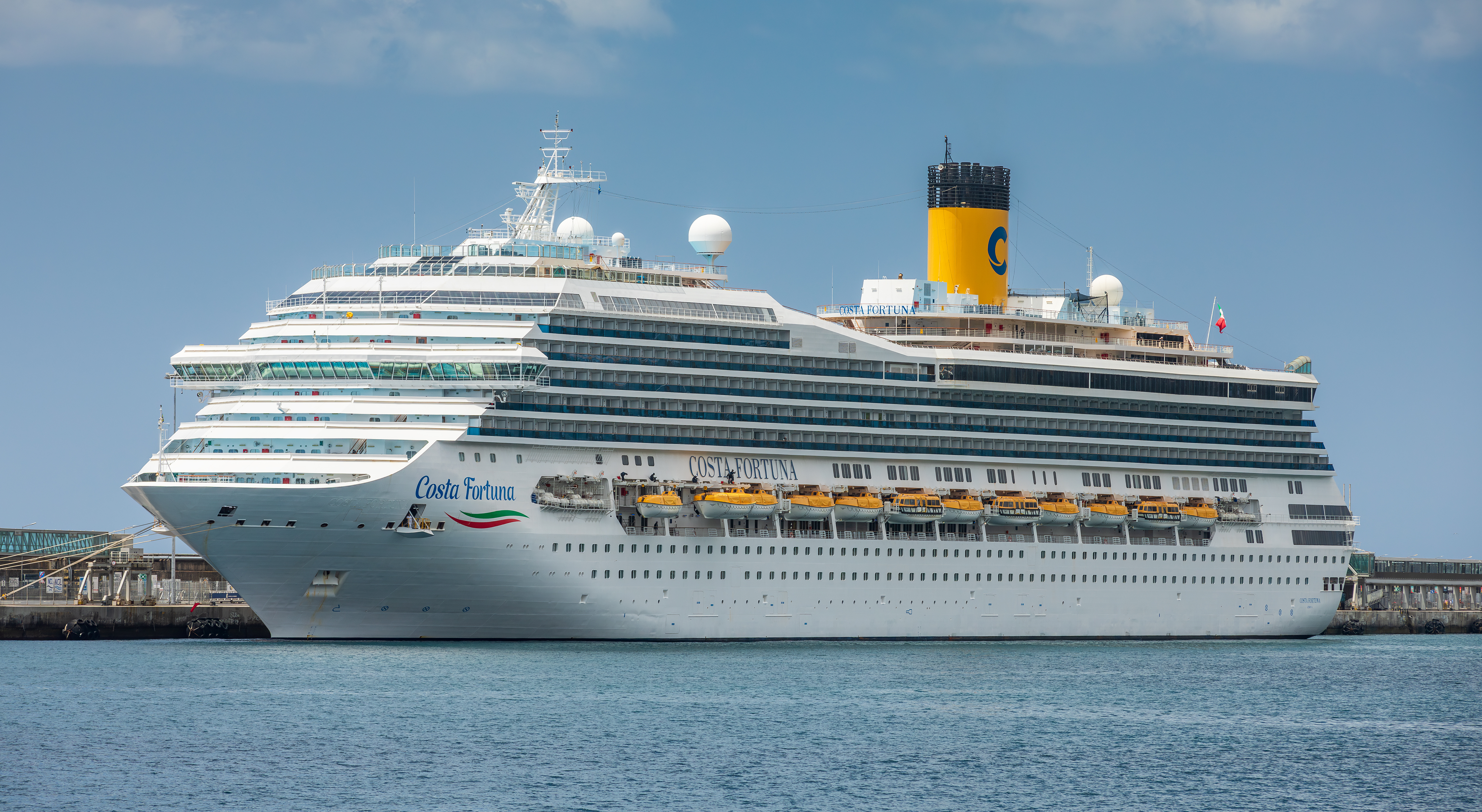
- Costa Fortuna in Funchal, Madeira, 2023

History
- Name: Costa Fortuna (2003–2026); Margaritaville at Sea Beachcomber (2026–present)
- Owner: Carnival Corporation (2003–2026); Paradise Cruise Line Operator (2026–Present)
- Operator: Costa Cruises (2003–2026); Margaritaville at Sea (2026-Present)
- Port of registry: Genoa, Italy (2003–2026); Madeira, Portugal (2026–Present)
- Route: Mediterranean (2003–2026); Caribbean (2026–present)
- Builder: Fincantieri, Italy
- Launched: 2003
- Christened: 31 October 2003
- Completed: 2003
- Acquired: 14 May 2025
- Maiden voyage: 25 November 2003
- In service: 17 November 2003
- Identification: Call sign: IBNY; IMO number: 9239783; MMSI number: 247094800
- Status: In Service

General characteristics
- Class & type: Fortuna-class cruise ship
- Tonnage: 102,669 GT; 8,200 DWT
- Length: 272.19 m (893 ft 0 in)
- Beam: 35.54 m (116 ft 7 in)
- Draught: 8.2 m (26 ft 11 in)
- Decks: 13
- Installed power: 63,360 kW (84,970 hp)
- Propulsion: 2 Azimuth thrusters
- Speed: 23 knots (43 km/h; 26 mph) (max)
- Capacity: 2,702 passengers (dual occupancy) 3,470 passengers (maximum)
- Crew: 1,090

Margaritaville at Sea Beachcomber, formerly Costa Fortuna, is a cruise ship for the Italian cruise line Costa Crociere built in 2003 on the same platform as Carnival Cruise Lines' Destiny class. She was inspired by the Italian steamships of the past. Models of these ships are on display in the ship's public areas. In the atrium, models of the 26 past and present ships of Costa's fleet were displayed upside down, on the ceiling, up to, and including, Costa Fortuna herself.

== Design and description ==
Ship models on atrium ceiling of Costa Fortuna

The vessel was built along the same lines as Carnival Cruise Lines' Destiny class. The aft decks are tiered and have limited open deck space. The vessel has a gross tonnage (GT) of 102,669 and 8,200 tons deadweight (DWT). (Note: Costa Crociere and Ward state that the vessel has a GT of 102,587.) Costa Fortuna is 272.19 metres (893 ft 0 in) long overall and 230 metres (754 ft 7 in) between perpendiculars with a beam of 35.54 m (116 ft 7 in) and a depth of 14.18 m (46 ft 6 in).

The ship is powered by a diesel-electric propulsion system creating 34,000 kilowatts (46,000 hp) servicing two azimuth thrusters. (Note: Leonardo Info states the vessel uses fixed-pitch propellers and creates 40,000 kW (54,000 hp).) There are 1,358 cabins ranging in size from 16.7–44.8 square metres (180–482 sq ft) of which 522 have a balcony. The vessel has a crew of 1,090. (Note: Ward has the crew numbering 1,068.) Costa Fortuna has the capacity for 2,702 passengers at dual occupancy and 3,470 passengers maximum. It has four restaurants and eleven bars and lounges. The interior decor is Art Deco.

== Construction and career ==
The ship was constructed by Fincantieri in Italy with a build date of 31 October 2003. Named Costa Fortuna for the daughter of the mythological god of the sea Poseidon, the cruise ship entered service on 17 November 2003. The vessel is owned and operated by Costa Crociere and registered in Genoa, Italy.

In December 2018, the cruise ship underwent an €8 million, six-day refit in Singapore. Prior to the refit, the vessel was based in China. Following the refit, Costa Fortuna was to operate out of Genoa. Costa Fortuna was replaced by Costa Venezia in the Chinese market. For the 2020/2021 season, Costa Fortuna sailed the Mediterranean Sea, with stops in Turkey, Greece and Spain.

Costa Fortuna attempted to dock at Phuket, Thailand on 6 March 2020, but was denied due to coronavirus fears by Thai officials because it was carrying passengers who had left Italy within the last two weeks. On 7 March, the ship attempted to dock at Penang in northern Malaysia, but was denied due to a complete ban on cruise ships. The ship returned to Singapore on 10 March 2020 and all passengers were found well and were allowed to disembark.

== Margaritaville at Sea ==
In May 2025, it was announced Costa Fortuna had been sold to Margaritaville at Sea and would leave the fleet in September 2026. The ship was renamed Margaritaville at Sea Beachcomber. The ship was renovated at Harland & Wolff, Belfast, as had the Margaritaville at Sea Islander some years earlier.
