= Transparency (linguistics) =

Term in linguistics

Linguistic transparency is a phrase which is used in multiple, overlapping subjects in the fields of linguistics and the philosophy of language. It has both normative and descriptive senses.

== Normative ==
Normatively, the phrase may describe the effort to suit one's rhetoric to the widest possible audience, without losing relevant information in the process.

Advocates of normative linguistic transparency often argue that linguistic opacity is dangerous to a democracy. These critics point out that jargon is deliberately employed in government and business. It encrypts morally suspect information in order to dull reaction to it: for example, the phrase "collateral damage" to refer to the manslaughter of innocents.

One play upon this view was by William Strunk, Jr. and E. B. White, who in the Elements of Style ruled that the writer ought to "eschew obfuscation".

The Plain Language Movement is an example of people who advocate using clearer, common language within the wider academic community.

Professor at New York University Alan Sokal, perpetrator of the Sokal hoax, is another noteworthy example of an advocate of linguistic transparency.

Writer and political philosopher George Orwell was a proponent of this view, which he captured in the landmark essay, "Politics and the English Language." Orwell wrote a novel, 1984, about a dystopian future controlled through a politically crafted language called "Newspeak." Newspeak is a language that is linguistically transparent in the descriptive sense, but not in the normative one.

Comedian George Carlin famously parodied the phenomenon in his stand-up comedy.

The approach may sound like common sense, but it faces the difficulty of figuring out how to communicate complex and uncommon ideas in a popular way.

== Descriptive ==
=== Definition in lexical semantics ===
In the field of lexical semantics, semantic transparency (in adjective form: semantically transparent) is a measure of the degree to which the meaning of a multimorphemic combination can be synchronically related to the meaning of its constituents. Semantic transparency is a scalar notion. At the top end of the scale are combinations whose meaning is fully transparent; at the bottom end are said to be semantically opaque (in noun form: semantic opacity).^{: p. 1}

=== Subtypes ===
Libben proposed a four-degree analysis of bimorphemic compounds:

1. TT (transparency–transparency): bedroom
2. OT (opacity–transparency): strawberry
3. TO (transparency–opacity): jailbird
4. OO (opacity–opacity): hogwash

=== Definition in logic and philosophy of language ===
Traditionally in logic and philosophy of language (starting from Frege with "opaque contexts" to Quine, Kaplan, Montague and Dummett), semantic transparency indicates when linguistic items have an unambiguous, well-defined, shared reference.

Often in this context, semantic transparency is the property of linguistic expressions or contexts whose reference is clear and substitution of co-referential terms preserves truth value.

In a broader, non-technical sense, some authors also use “transparent language” for formal or logical idioms (like programming languages) where reference is unambiguous, versus natural language which is context-sensitive, whose terms aren't necessarily well defined and whose interpretation isn't necessarily consistent for all speakers.
