= List of acronyms: V =

This list contains acronyms, initialisms, and pseudo-blends that begin with the letter V.

For the purposes of this list:

- acronym = an abbreviation pronounced as if it were a word, e.g., SARS = severe acute respiratory syndrome, pronounced to rhyme with cars
- initialism = an abbreviation pronounced wholly or partly using the names of its constituent letters, e.g., CD = compact disc, pronounced cee dee
- pseudo-blend = an abbreviation whose extra or omitted letters mean that it cannot stand as a true acronym, initialism, or portmanteau (a word formed by combining two or more words).

(a) = acronym, e.g.: SARS – (a) severe acute respiratory syndrome
(i) = initialism, e.g.: CD – (i) compact disc
(p) = pseudo-blend, e.g.: UNIFEM – (p) United Nations Development Fund for Women
(s) = symbol (none of the above, representing and pronounced as something else; for example: MHz – megahertz)

Some terms are spoken as either acronym or initialism, e.g., VoIP, pronounced both as voyp and V-O-I-P.

(Main list of acronyms)

- V – (s) 5 (in Roman numerals) - Vanadium – Volt

== VA ==
- VA – (s) Vatican City-State (ISO 3166 digram) – (i) Veterans Affairs (U.S. Department of) – (s) Virginia (postal symbol) – (i) Various Artists
- VACIS – (a) Vehicle And Container Inspection System
- VACIS – (a) Victorian Ambulance Clinical Information System
- VACUUM - (a) Valid Accurate Consistent Uniform Unified Model
- VANOS – (p) Variable Nockenwelle System
- VAO – (i) Vienna Art Orchestra
- VASIS – (a) Visual Approach Slope Indicator System (aviation)
- VAT – (i) Value-Added Tax – (s) Vatican City-State (ISO 3166 trigram)

== VB ==
- VB – (i) Victoria Bitter (beer) – Visual Basic
- VBA – (i) Visual Basic for Applications

== VC ==
- VC – (s) Saint Vincent and the Grenadines (FIPS 10-4 country code; ISO 3166 digram) – (i) Victoria Cross
- VCDS – (i) (Canada) Vice-Chief of the Defence Staff – (i) VAG-COM Diagnostic System
- vCJD – (i) Variant Creutzfeldt–Jakob disease
- VCJCS – (i) Vice Chairman, Joint Chiefs of Staff
- VCNO – (i) (U.S.) Vice Chief of Naval Operations
- VCR – (i) Video cassette recorder
- VCofS – (i) Vice Chief of Staff
- VCT – (s) Saint Vincent and the Grenadines (ISO 3166 trigram)

== VD ==
- VD – (s) North Vietnam (ISO 3166 digram, obsolete 1977) – (i) Venereal Disease
- VDFS - (i) VisualSVN Distributed File System (VDFS)
- VDMOS – (i/a) Vertical Double-diffused MOS transistor ("vee-dee-moss")
- VDOT – (i/a) Virginia Department of Transportation ("vee-dot")
- VDR – (s) North Vietnam (ISO 3166 trigram, obsolete 1977)

== VE ==
- ve – (s) Venda language (ISO 639-1 code)
- VE – (s) Venezuela (FIPS 10-4 country code; ISO 3166 digram)
- VEB – (s) Venezuelan bolívar (ISO 4217 currency code)
- VEEGA – (a) Venus Earth Earth Gravity Assist manœuvre
- ven – (s) Venda language (ISO 639-2 code)
- VEN – (s) Venezuela (ISO 3166 trigram)
- VERDI – (i) Vittorio Emanuele Re D'Italia (Victor Emmanuel, King of Italy)
- VERITAS – (a) Very Energetic Radiation Imaging Telescope Array System

== VF ==
- VF - (i) VinFast (Vietnamese automobile brand)
- VFA
  - (i) Victorian Football Association (historic Australian rules football league)
  - (i) Volatile Fatty Acid
  - (s) Fixed-wing Strike Fighter Squadron (U.S Naval Aviation squadron type)
- VfD – (i) Articles for deletion (used in Wikipedia)
- VFL – (i) Victorian Football League, the name of two distinct Australian rules football leagues:

1. The original VFL, formed when the original VFA split in 1896, evolved into today's Australian Football League.
2. The modern VFL, which operates to this day as a semi-professional developmental league for the AFL, is the successor to the VFA.

- VFM – (i) Value For Money
- VFMO – (i) Very Fast Moving Object (astronomy)
- VFR – (i) Visual Flight Rules
- VFT – (i) Virtual Function Table
- VFW – (i) Veterans of Foreign Wars

== VG ==
- VG – (s) British Virgin Islands (ISO 3166 digram)
- VGB – (s) British Virgin Islands (ISO 3166 trigram)

== VH ==
- VH1 – (a/i) Video Hits One
- VHF – (i) Very High Frequency

== VI ==
- vi – (s) Vietnamese language (ISO 639-1 code)
- VI – (s) 6 (in Roman numerals) – British Virgin Islands (FIPS 10-4 territory code) – United States Virgin Islands (postal symbol; ISO 3166 digram) – (i) vide infra (Latin, "see below") – Virtual Instrument (LabVIEW)
- VIA – (a) Versatile Interface Adapter
- VIC – (s) Victoria, Australia (postal symbol) – (a) Video Interface Chip – Virginia Intermont College
- VIDS – (i) Visual Information Display System
- vie – (s) Vietnamese language (ISO 639-2 code)
- VII – (s) 7 (in Roman numerals)
- VIII – (s) 8 (in Roman numerals)
- VIN – (i/a) Vehicle Identification Number (ISO 3779)
- VIP – (i) see entry
- VIR – (s) United States Virgin Islands (ISO 3166 trigram) – Virgin Atlantic (ICAO code)
- VIS – (i) Vavoua International School – Vienna Independent Shorts – Viewable Image Size – Visual Instruction Set
- VISCII – (p) VIetnamese Standard Code for Information Interchange
- VIT – (i) Vellore Institute of Technology
- VIVO – (i) Video In Video Out

== VJ ==
- VJ – (i) Video Jockey

== VK ==
- VK – (s) Australia (ham radio code) – (i) Västerbottens-Kuriren, a Swedish daily newspaper

== VL ==
- VLA – (i) Very Large Array – (UK) Veterinary Laboratories Agency
- VLAD – (a/i) Vertical Line Array DIFAR
- VLBA – (i) Very Long Baseline Array
- VLF – (i) Very Low Frequency
- VLIW – (i) Very Long Instruction Word
- VLPFC – (i) VentroLateral PreFrontal Cortex
- VLPMC – (i) VentroLateral PreMotor Cortex
- VLSF – (i) Vieille langue des signes française, Old French Sign Language
- VLSI – (i) Very-large-scale integration
- VLVS – (i) Very Loud, Very Stinky

== VM ==
- VM – (s) Vietnam (FIPS 10-4 country code)
- VMASC – (i/a) Virginia Modeling Analysis & Simulation Center ("vee-mask")
- VMF – (i) Variable Message Format
- VMF – Marine Fighting Squadron of the United States Marine Corps
- VMN – (p) VentroMedial Nucleus (neurophysiology)

== VN ==
- VN
  - (s) Vietnam (ISO 3166 digram)
  - Vietnam Airlines (IATA code)
  - Vietnam's aircraft registration prefix
- VND – (s) Vietnamese đồng (ISO 4217 currency code)
- VNIR – (i) Visible and Near InfraRed
- VNM – (s) Vietnam (ISO 3166 trigram)
- VNS – see entry

== VO ==
- VOA – (i) Voice of America
- vo – (s) Volapük language (ISO 639-1 code)
- VOC – (i) Vereenigde Oostindische Compagnie (Dutch East India Company) – Volatile organic compounds
- VOIP – (a, i) Voice Over Internet Protocol
- vol – (s) Volapük language (ISO 639-2 code)
- VOLT – (a) Visual OpenType Layout Tool
- VON – (i) Victorian Order of Nurses
- VOR – (i) VHF Omnidirectional Ranging
- VOR – (a) Voice of Russia
- VOV - (i) Voice of Vietnam
- VOX – (p) Voice Operated eXchange (Voice-operated oscillator)

== VP ==
- VP – (a/i) Vice-president ("veep")
- VPN – (i) Virtual private network

== VQ ==
- VQ
  - (i) Vector quantization
  - (s) U.S. Virgin Islands (FIPS 10-4 territory code)
  - Aircraft registration prefix for Bermuda, the Cayman Islands, Saint Helena and Turks and Caicos.

== VR ==
- VR – (i) Virtual reality
- VROTS – (i) Victorian rare or threatened species
- VRSG – (i) Virtual reality scene generator
- V/R - (i) Very respectfully; standard military closure

== VS ==
- VS – (i) Very special (brandy grade) – vide supra (Latin, "see above")
- VSAT – (a) Very small aperture terminal ("vee-satt")
- VSHORAD – (p) Very short range air defence
- VSO – (i) Voluntary Services Overseas
- VSOP – (i) Variations séculaires des orbites planétaires (French, "Planetary Orbit Secular Variations") – Very small outline package (integrated circuit) – Very superior old pale (brandy grade) – VLBI Space Observatory Programme
- VSR – (i) Very special relativity
- V/STOL – (p) Vertical/short take-off and landing ("vee-stoll")

== VT ==
- VT
  - (s) Vatican City-State (FIPS 10-4 country code)
  - Vermont (postal symbol)
  - (i) Video tape
  - Virginia Tech
- VTC – (i) Video Tele-Conference
- VTEC – (i) Variable valve Timing and Electronic lift Control
- VTOL – (i) Vertical Take-Off & Landing

== VU ==
- VU – (s) Vanuatu (ISO 3166 digram) – (i) Vedanta University
- VUB – (i) Vrije Universiteit Brussel (Belgian university)
- VUK – (a) Value Up Kit
- VUT – (s) Vanuatu (ISO 3166 trigram)
- VUV – (s) Vanuatu vatu (ISO 4217 currency code)

== VV ==
- V&V – (i) Verification & Validation
- VV – (i) Via Voice – Village Voice
- VV&A – (i) Verification, Validation & Accreditation
- VVAF – (i) Vietnam Veterans of America Foundation

== VW ==
- VW – (i) Volkswagen

== VZ ==
- VZ – (s) Verizon Communications (NYSE code)
- vzw – (i) vereniging zonder winstoogmerk (Dutch "non-profit organisation")
