= FVS =

FVS may refer to:

- Finland Station, in St. Petersburg, Russia
- Football video support
- Forest Vegetation Simulator
- Fountain Valley School of Colorado, in the United States
- Fujitsu V8 Supercars Series
- Victoria Street railway station, Perth, in Western Australia

== See also ==
- FV (disambiguation)
