= VSR =

VSR may refer to:

- VSR-10 rifles by Tokyo Marui
- VSR V8 Trophy, a stock car racing series
- V&S Railway, Kansas, USA, reporting mark
- Voltage-sensitive relay in electronics
- Variable shunt reactor, high voltage stabilizer
- Very Special Relativity in physics
- Very short patch repair in DNA
- Victorian Scottish Regiment, Australia
- Virtual Super Resolution on AMD graphics cards
- Video Super Resolution on Nvidia graphics cards
- Vibratory Stress Relief in mechanical engineering
- Vincenzo Sospiri Racing, an Italian auto racing team
- Video super-resolution, video upscaling technique
