= VCDS =

VCDS may refer to:

- Vice-Chief of the Defence Staff (disambiguation)
  - Vice-Chief of the Defence Staff (United Kingdom)
  - Vice Chief of the Defence Staff (Canada)
- VCDS (software) (VAG-COM Diagnostic System), a software package used for diagnostics and adjustments of Volkswagen Group motor vehicles

== See also ==
- VCD (disambiguation)
