= F5 =

F5, F.V, F 5, F05 or F-5 may refer to:

== Aircraft ==
- F 5 Ljungbyhed, a Swedish Air Force training wing
- Caproni Trento F-5, a jet aircraft of the 1950s
- Caproni Vizzola F.5, an Italian fighter aircraft of 1939
- Felixstowe F.5, a 1918 British flying boat
- Fokker F.V, a 1922 Dutch aircraft
- Northrop F-5, a jet light fighter
- F-5 Lightning, a photo-reconnaissance version of the Lockheed P-38 Lightning
- Shenyang F-5, a version of the Chinese Shenyang J-5 jet fighter

== Transportation and vehicles ==
- SpaceX Falcon 5, proposed space launch rocket

=== Automobiles ===
- BYD F5, a Chinese compact sedan
- DKW F5, a German subcompact sedan
- Haval F5, a Chinese compact SUV
- Hennessey Venom F5, an American sports car

=== Roads and routes ===
- F-05 (Michigan county highway)
- Vermont Route F-5, state highway in Vermont

=== Locomotives ===
- LNER Class F5, a class of British steam locomotives

=== Ships ===
- Italian submarine F5, an Italian Regia Marina (Royal Navy) submarine in commission from 1916 to 1929
- Neutral Bay ferry service in Sydney, Australia, known as the F5

== Other ==
- F5 (band), a rock band
- F5 (character), a fictional character in the webtoon series Live with Yourself!
- F5 (classification), a wheelchair sport classification
- F5 mandolin, a musical instrument
- F5, Inc., a manufacturer of network equipment
- F5 Tower, a skyscraper in Seattle, Washington
- Cosmic Air (IATA airline designator), an airline in Kathmandu, Nepal
- Factor V, a protein of the coagulation system
- Factsheet Five, a magazine sometimes referred as F5
- Faugère F5 algorithm, for computing the Gröbner basis of an ideal of a multivariate polynomial ring
- Nikon F5, an SLR camera
- F5 tornado, the highest intensity rating on the Fujita scale
- F-5, trademark finishing move of American professional wrestler Brock Lesnar
- F5, a function key on a computer keyboard
- F05, a Japanese Industrial Standard connector for optical fiber cables

== See also ==
- FV (disambiguation)
- 5F (disambiguation)
