= Upscale =

Upscale may refer to:

- Image scaling
- Luxury goods
- Video scaler
