= VTS =

VTS can refer to:

- Vanishing testes syndrome, another name for anorchia
- Vanishing twin syndrome, a complication of multiple pregnancy
- Vehicle Telematics System, remote control, monitoring, and navigation of road vehicles
- Vehicle tracking system, equipment and programs for monitoring road vehicle locations
- Vessel traffic service, maritime traffic control system for a port or harbor
- Vertical Tabulation Set, character code 0x8A in the C0 and C1 control codes
- Virginia Theological Seminary, an Episcopal seminary in Alexandria, Virginia
- Video Title Set, a directory element on a DVD-Video disk
- Virtual Tape Server, an IBM Virtual tape library system
- VTS, an ICAO airline code for Everts Air

== See also ==
- VT (disambiguation)
- VT 5 (disambiguation)
