= VBS =

VBS may refer to:

- .vbs, the file extension for VBScript scripts
- Brescia Airport's IATA airport code
- the Federal Department of Defence, Civil Protection and Sport (Eidgenössisches Departement für Verteidigung, Bevölkerungsschutz und Sport) of Switzerland
- Vacation Bible School, a week-long summer youth religious program
- Valley Beth Shalom, a synagogue in Encino, California, US
- Value breakdown structure in project management
- VBS Mutual Bank, a defunct South African mutual bank
- VBS.tv, the broadband video network of Vice magazine
- VBScript, a programming language developed by Microsoft
- Vereinigte Breslauer Sportfreunde, a defunct German football club
- Vetting and Barring Scheme of the Independent Safeguarding Authority, UK
- Video Baseband Signal, an unmodulated analog B/W video signal used e.g., by the Composite Video standard
- Virtualization Based Security, a feature of the Microsoft Windows operating system
- Virtual Battlespace, a military tactical shooter simulation used for dismounted infantry training by the USMC, the US Army, and a number of other NATO armed forces—see also Deployable Virtual Training Environment
- Vividh Bharati Service, an Indian radio channel
- Vande Bharat Sleeper Express

== See also ==
- VB (disambiguation)
