= V1 =

V1 can refer to the first version of anything.

V1, V01 or V-1 may also refer to:

== In aircraft ==
- V-1 flying bomb, a World War II German weapon
- V_{1} speed, the maximum speed at which an aircraft pilot may abort a takeoff without causing a runway overrun
- Vultee V-1, an American single-engine airliner of the 1930s
- Fokker V.1, a German parasol monoplane experimental fighter prototype, built in 1916
- The first prototype/experimental (Versuchs) airframe of nearly any German WW II-era military aircraft

== Vessels ==
- V1-class destroyer, a German World War I destroyer class
- USS V-1, 1924–1931 designation of the USS Barracuda (SS-163), first of the US "V-boat" series of submarines
- V1, a rudderless single-paddler outrigger canoe
- V1, the first prototype of the Panzer VIII Maus tank

== In medicine ==
- V1, the primary visual cortex
- V_{1}, the ophthalmic nerve, first division of the trigeminal nerve
- V_{1}, one of six precordial leads in electrocardiography

== Other uses ==
- Base form (V_{1}) of an English verb
- ATC code V01 Allergens, a subgroup of the Anatomical Therapeutic Chemical Classification System
- V1 (classification), a Paralympic archery classification for people with visual disabilities
- LNER Class V1, a 1930–1939 British 2-6-2 tank engine class
- NER Class V1, a class of British steam locomotives officially classified V/09, but classified V1 in some sources
- Nikon 1 V1, a camera
- V1 Gallery, in Copenhagenany
- ITU-T V.1, a telecommunication recommendation
- V1, a visual query language for property graphs
- Z1 (computer), previously known as V1
- V1 (film), a 2019 Indian film
- V1, the player character of the video game Ultrakill
- Socket V1, codename of Intel's LGA 1851
- Pro V1, a golf ball made by Titleist

== See also ==
- VI (disambiguation) (letter "i" as opposed to number "1")
- 1V (disambiguation)
