= Pierre Geneves =

French computer scientist (born 1980)

Pierre Genevès
- Born: 1980 (age 45–46); Cahors
- Education: INPG
- Known for: His work in logics for structured data and the modelling of queries
- Awards: EADS Prize; CNRS Bronze medal
- Scientific career
- Fields: Computer Science

Pierre Genevès is a French computer scientist born in 1980. He is a research scientist at CNRS and recipient of the 2013 CNRS Bronze medal.

== Biography ==
Born in Cahors in 1980, Pierre Genevès founded in 2001 a software company developing a graphic software, later marketed under the name of AceDesign Pro by the Canadian software company Visicom Media.

He worked at IBM Research in New York City in 2003 and 2004 where he studied the design of scalable architectures for querying and transforming flows of structured data.

He graduated from the university of Grenoble from which he received a PhD in computer science in 2006. His thesis, concerning computational logic for reasoning on tree-shaped data, was awarded the EADS prize for the best PhD thesis in 2007, and the prize for the best PhD thesis from the INPG university in 2008.

After a post-doctorate at the Swiss Federal Institute of Technology in Lausanne (EPFL) 2007, he joined CNRS where he studied and contributed to the field of modal logics, like the modal mu-calculus, that he used for modeling query languages, and allow for the automated reasoning about programs that manipulate structured data. Pioneer of the static analysis of cascading style sheets for web pages, his results in logic also apply to the fields of programming languages, software engineering and artificial intelligence.

== Awards ==
- EADS Prize in 2007
- CNRS Bronze medal in 2013.

== Bibliography ==
- (in English) On the Analysis of Cascading Style Sheets, Pierre Genevès, Nabil Layaida, and Vincent Quint, Proceedings of the 21st International Conference on World Wide Web (WWW), p. 809–818, 2012.
- (in English) Genevès, Pierre (2009). Logics for XML: Reasoning with Trees. ISBN 978-3639193718.
- (in English) Efficient Static Analysis of XML Paths and Types, Pierre Genevès, Nabil Layaida, and Alan Schmitt, Proceedings of the ACM SIGPLAN Conference on Programming Language Design and Implementation (PLDI), p. 342–351, June 2007.
- Portrait at the Pantheon, Exhibition in Paris, 2010
