= FV =

FV may stand for:

== Groups, organizations, companies ==
- Rossiya (airline), Russian airline (IATA code: FV)
- Fachbuchverlag Leipzig, a German publishing house
- Federal Vision, an evangelical Christian faith
- Funk Volume, a hip hop record label founded by American hip-hop artist Hopsin

== Arts and entertainment ==
- Fantasy violence, a type of television parental rating
- FarmVille, a social networking game on Facebook

== Transportation and vehicles ==
- Fishing vessel
- "Fighting Vehicle" in the British Army; see List of FV series military vehicles
- Fokker F.V, a 1922 Dutch aircraft
- Lockheed XFV, an experimental "tailsitter" aircraft

== Technical, science and technology ==
- Future value, in finance
- Factor V, a protein of the coagulation system
- Fragment variable of an antibody, in biology

== Other uses ==
- Taco Hemingway, a Polish rapper, formerly known as FV
- Fountain Valley, California, United States

== See also ==
- VF (disambiguation)
- F5 (disambiguation)
- FU (disambiguation)
- FW (disambiguation)
