= Virtual instrument =

Virtual instrument may refer to:

- A Software synthesizer, a computer program or plug-in that generates digital audio
- Virtual instrumentation, customized software measurement systems that implement functions of an instrument by computer, sensors and actuators

== See also ==
- VI (disambiguation)
