= Vuk =

VUK or Vuk may refer to:

- Vuk (name), South Slavic given name
  - Vuk, Ban of Bosnia (fl. 14th c.), a member of the Kotromanić dynasty
  - Vuk Karadžić (1787–1864), Serbian language reformer and folklorist, often referred to simply as Vuk
- Vuk (film), an animated Hungarian movie from 1981
- Vuk (novel), a 1965 novel by Istvan Fekete
- Vuk, a D'Bari character in the 2019 film Dark Phoenix
- Vuk (computer), 1980s Yugoslavian computer prototype
- VUK-T (glider), often called VUK, a 1970s high-performance Yugoslavian sailplane
- Vuk., taxonomic author abbreviation for Ljudevit Vukotinović (1813–1893), Croatian naturalist
- Volume Unique Key, in the AACS encryption system from the 2000s
- Value Up Kit
- Vertical up-kicker, a pinball part
