= 5F =

5F may refer to:

- 5f electrons, of an electron configuration
- The Armageddon Factor (production code: 5F), a 1979 Doctor Who serial
- FlyOne (IATA code: 5F), a Moldovan low-cost airline
- Arctic Circle Air (former IATA code: 5F), a former US-American airline

== See also ==
- 5-Fluoro-AMT (5-F-AMT)
- F5 (disambiguation)
