= Vor =

VOR or vor may refer to:

== Organizations ==
- Vale of Rheidol Railway in Wales
- Verkehrsverbund Ost-Region in Austria
- Voice of Russia, a radio broadcaster

== Science, technology and medicine ==
- VHF omnidirectional range, a radio navigation aid used in aviation
- Vestibulo-ocular reflex, a reflex eye movement
- Voice-operated recording, see Voice-operated switch
- Visual operating rules, another term for visual flight rules in aviation
- Video operation room, part of the set-up for the video assistant referee in association football

== Entertainment ==
- Vor of Barrayar, the noble families of Barrayar in the science fiction Vorkosigan Saga
- Vor (Star Wars), a race in the Star Wars universe
- VOR, a 1958 science fiction novel by James Blish
- Vor Daj, protagonist of the 1940 novel Synthetic Men of Mars by Edgar Rice Burroughs
- Russian title of the 1997 film The Thief
- VOR: The Maelstrom, a science fiction miniature wargame
- VOR, a search engine and media company in the Doctor Who episode "Spyfall"
- Captain Vor, an antagonist in the videogame Warframe

== Other uses ==
- The goddess Vör in Norse mythology
- vor, ISO 639-3 code for the Voro language of Nigeria
- Version of record, a fixed copyedited, typeset and formatted manuscript

== See also ==
- Vor v zakone, or thief in law, a rank in the Russian Mafia
