= Vol =

Vol, VOL or Vols may refer to:

- Vol (command), a computer operating system command
- Vol (heraldry), a heraldic charge
- Volatility (finance)
- Volume (disambiguation)
- Volunteer (Irish republican)
- Nashville Vols, an American minor league baseball team
- Nea Anchialos National Airport (IATA: VOL), an airport located near the town of Nea Anchialos in Greece
- Tennessee Volunteers, the sports teams of the University of Tennessee
- Republic of Upper Volta, a country in Africa now called Burkina Faso
- Vigilantes of Love, an American rock band
- Volans, a constellation
- Volapük, a constructed international auxiliary language
- Volunteer State Community College, a community college in Gallatin, Tennessee
- Vol, Iran, a village in Kurdistan Province, Iran
- Vol Dooley (1927–2014), former sheriff of Bossier Parish, Louisiana
- "Vol", a 2021 song by Merel Baldé

== See also ==
- Völs (disambiguation)
