= VMN =

VMN may refer to:

- Virtual manufacturing network
- Visicom Media Network
- Vysshaya Mera Nakazaniya, a legal term for "the supreme measure of punishment", a euphemism for capital punishment
- Ventromedial nucleus of the hypothalamus
- A fictional brain area in Philip Kerr's novel A Philosophical Investigation
- Viacom Media Networks, the former name for Paramount Media Networks, the pay-TV division of Paramount Global
