= VT 5 =

VT5 or variant, may refer to:

== Places ==
- Vermont's 5th congressional district (VT 5), Vermont, USA
- Vermont Route 5 (VT-5), Vermont, USA
- Viitostie 5 (Vt5), Finnish national road 5, Finland; see List of highways numbered 5

== Military ==
- VT-5 tank, a Chinese light tank
- VFA-14, formerly VT-5, a U.S. Navy fighter attack squadron based at Naval Air Station Lemoore, California
- VA-55 (U.S. Navy), formerly Torpedo Squadron VT-5, an attack squadron 1943–1975
- VT-5, a U.S. Navy training squadron based at Saufley Field, Florida; disestablished 1976

== See also ==
- VTS (disambiguation)
- VT-55 (disambiguation)
