= VT-55 =

VT-55 or variant, may refer to:

- VT55, a computer terminal from Digital Equipment Corporation (DEC)
- VT 55 railcar; a Deutsche Bundesbahn railcar
- VT-55, a variant of the MT-55 combat support vehicle

== See also ==
- VT-55A
- VT 5 (disambiguation)
