= Retrotink =

Producer of retro console compatibility hardware

- Retrotink 4K
- Manufacturer: Retrotink, LLC
- Introduced: 2018; 8 years ago
- Type: Video scaler

Retrotink (stylized as RetroTINK) is a series of video scalers oriented toward enthusiasts of classic video games. Each supports a wide variety of video signals, both analog and digital, across different video game and computing platforms. The first in the Retrotink line was released in 2018.

== History ==
Retrotink was developed by Mike Chi, an electrical engineer based in San Diego, California, who works in the field of medical device design. Chi developed the Retrotink in the late 2010s after revisiting his childhood pastime of video gaming. Dissatisfied with the quality of the built-in video scalers of his modern TV, he set out to create a standalone scaler that could outperform it in both picture quality and latency. The first device in the Retrotink series, the Retrotink 2X, was released in 2018.

The second in the series, the Retrotink 2X Pro, was released in 2020. It includes inputs for component, composite, and S-Video (with supports multiple regional analog signals including NTSC and PAL), outputting the converted and scaled digital video over HDMI. A separate version supporting SCART input was also available. It received positive reviews, with The Sydney Morning Herald's Tim Biggs calling it a "handy gadget" that was easier to set up than the Open Source Scan Converter. The third in the line, the Retrotink 5X Pro, was released in 2021. It added support for a number of output resolutions, as well as the ability to input SCART signal over composite cables.

In the beginning of 2022, Chi began development of the Retrotink 4K, which he called the "5X on steroids". The 4K adds inputs for HD15 (VGA) and HDMI 2.0, allowing it to receive signals from most personal computers and modern video game consoles. It also fixed a number of bugs while adding support for more obscure devices such as arcade boards and some less commercially successful video game consoles. It was released in late 2023 to wide acclaim; Darran Jones of Retro Gamer called it "an upscaler without equal" that was a "mind-blowing follow-up to the superb Retrotink 5X", albeit quite expensive, a sentiment shared by ComingSoon.net's Shaan Joshi. A scaled-down alternative with less features, the Retrotink 4K CE, was released in early 2025.

By 2025, Chi had sold thousands of units of the Retrotink, remarking that the market for classic video gaming was larger than he had originally anticipated. In April 2025, Retrotink briefly suspended shipments within the United States as a result of the Liberation Day tariffs. A successor to the 4K CE, the 6X CE, was released in August 2026.
