= 1V =

1V may refer to:

- Wind Jet's IATA code
- Canon EOS-1V
- SSH 1V (WA); see Washington State Route 509
- UH-1V; see Bell UH-1 Iroquois variants
- Mil-17-1V, a model of Mil Mi-17
- APR-1V, a model of Angkut Personel Ringan by Pindad
- 1V (V-67), manufacturer's designation for Venera 4
- First Volition (or Confident Volition) in the psychosophy typology
- EenVandaag, Dutch television news program

== See also ==
- Volt
- V1 (disambiguation)
