= VOC =

VOC, VoC or voc may refer to:

== Science and technology ==
- Open-circuit voltage (V_{OC}), the voltage between two terminals when there is no external load connected
- Variant of concern, a category used during the assessment of a new variant of a virus
- Volatile organic compound, a category of vaporous chemical
- Voice user interface, voice on control (VOC)
- Creative Voice file, an audio file format with extension .voc

== Organisations ==
- Dutch East India Company (Dutch: Vereenigde Oost-Indische Compagnie; 1602–1800), a Dutch chartered company
- Vancouver Organizing Committee for the 2010 Olympic and Paralympic Winter Games, the organizer of the 2010 Vancouver Olympics
- Vannes Olympique Club, a French association football club
- Victims of Communism Memorial Foundation, an anti-communist organization in the United States
- VOC Amsterdam (Dutch: Volewijckers-Oriënto-Combinatie Amsterdam), a women's handball club in the Netherlands
- Voice of China (disambiguation)
- Voice of Chonil (VOC), Jeonil Broadcasting Corporation, Korean Broadcasting System, South Korea; an AM radio station

== People ==
- V. O. Chidambaram Pillai (1872–1936), Indian lawyer, trade union leader, shipping magnate and freedom fighter

== Places ==
- 10649 VOC, a minor planet, the asteroid VOC (Vereeniging van de Oostindische Company), the 10649th asteroid registered, a main-belt asteroid
- VOC Cricket Ground, Rotterdam, Netherlands; operated by VOC Rotterdam

=== Places in India named after V. O. Chidambaram ===
- V.O. Chidambaram College, Thoothukudi, Tamil Nadu, India
- V. O. C. Nagar railway station, Chennai, Tamil Nadu, India (Indian Railways station code: VOC)
- VOC park and zoo, Coimbatore, Tamil Nadu, India
- VOC Park, Erode, Erode, Tamil Nadu, India
  - VOC Park Stadium, Erode, Tamil Nadu, India
- V.O.C. Salai, Chennai, road in Chennai, Tamil Nadu, India

== Other uses ==
- vocabulary
- Vocational (voc.)
  - vocational education
    - vocational school
- Voice of the customer, a term to describe the process of capturing a customer's requirements

== See also ==
- Bachelor of Vocational Education (B.Voc)
