= VFT =

VFT, an abbreviation, may refer to:

- Variable frequency transformer, a type of electricity transformer
- Venus Flytrap, a variety of carnivorous plant
- Vertical fire-tube boiler, a heat-transfer device used in steam engines
- Very Fast Train, a proposed high-speed railway in Australia
- Virtual field trip, a method used in online education
- Virtual function table, a mechanism used in programming language
- Vogel–Fulcher–Tammann equation, an equation used to describe the viscosity of liquids as a function of temperature
