= VZ =

Vz, VZ or VŽ may refer to:

People:

- Volodymyr Zelenskyy, president of Ukraine

Businesses and brands:

- VZ Holding, a Swiss financial service company
- Toyota VZ engine A series of V6 engines
- Holden VZ Commodore, a model of GM Holden's Commodore produced from 2004 to 2006
- Thai Vietjet Air (current airline, IATA code VZ)
- MyTravel Airways (former airline, IATA code VZ)
- Verizon Communications (NYSE stock symbol VZ)
- VodafoneZiggo, a Dutch telecommunications company owned by Liberty Global and Vodafone Group

Other uses:

- Varaždin, Croatia (license plate code VŽ)
- Veer-Zaara, a Bollywood film
- Virtualization, typically of computer systems
- Vorzugsaktie, a German abbreviation for Preferred stock
