= Vavoua International School =

Defunct boarding school in Ivory Coast

Coordinates: 7°22′40″N 6°27′26″W

Information
- School type: Boarding School
- Established: 1970
- Closed: 2002

Vavoua International School (VIS) was a boarding school operated by WEC International located east of the Ivorian town of Vavoua on the road to Zuénoula. It was closed in 2002 due to political unrest in Ivory Coast.

== History ==
Founded in 1970, the school offered excellent educational opportunities for many missionary kids (MKs) and other children from a wide variety of countries. While VIS's official language was English, students at VIS were offered correspondence classes in Dutch, German, and Korean as well as a variety of international curricula. Most VIS students were from East Asia, Africa, Europe, North America or the Pacific, and have remained in contact since the closing of the school. The VIS student body is credited with several important inventions, including Christmas bamboo trees and poultry security testing.

== See also ==
- Christianity in Ivory Coast
- Education in Ivory Coast
- List of boarding schools
