= V1 (classification) =

Para-archery classification

V1 Classification
- Sport: Paralympic Archery
- Administrator: International Archery Federation

V1 is a para-archery classification for people with visual disabilities.

== History ==
A version of this classification first appeared in 1998 during the world championships, when the sport's governing body decided to pilot a classification programme. At the time, there was a classification called W2, which was for all standing archers with disabilities.

== Sport ==
This is an archery classification for people with visual impairments.

== Becoming classified ==
Classification is handled by FITA – International Archery Federation. World archery classification is done by at least three people. One of them must have a medical background. On the national level, there only needs to be one classifier. Archery classification is done by medical professionals.

== See also ==
- Para-archery classification
- Archery at the Summer Paralympics
