= Völs =

Völs may refer to:

- Völs, Tyrol, a town in the district of Innsbruck-Land in Tyrol, Austria
- Völs am Schlern, a town located in South Tyrol, Italy
- Gerd Völs (born 1909), German Olympic rower
