= VDR =

VDR may refer to:

- V^{dr}, an archaic abbreviation for "van der"
- vdR, abbreviation for "van der Roest", a family name of Dutch origin
- Vandalur railway station, Chennai, Tamil Nadu, India (station code)
- Verein Deutscher Rosenfreunde, the Union of German Friends of Roses
- Vertical dimension at rest, a mandibular position used in dentistry to estimate vertical dimension of occlusion
- Virginia Declaration of Rights
- Virtual data room
- Vitamin D receptor
- Video Disk Recorder, also known as Linux VDR, a software to record and store digital video on a Linux computer
- Voltage-dependent resistor
- Volunteer Disaster Responder
- Voyage Data Recorder, an electronic device on ships that records navigational status for later accident investigation (a type of black box)
- Vehicle data recorder, an electronic device in automotive units that records OBDII CAN BUS data
- Voltage Divider Rule, or Voltage Division Rule, a fundamental of electronics, that a point between multiple resistors will be at a voltage based on the ratio of resistor values.$Vout=Vin * \frac{R2}{R1+R2}$
