= VM =

VM may refer to:

== Businesses and organizations ==
- VM Motori, an Italian diesel engine manufacturer
- VMware, Inc., an American technology company
- Vauxhall Motors, a British car maker
- Virgin Media, a cable provider in the United Kingdom
- Virgin Mobile, a mobile phone service
- Virgin Money, a financial services brand
- Voice of Music (V-M), an audio equipment manufacturer

== Science and technology ==
- VM reactor, various series of nuclear pressurized water reactors
- VM (nerve agent)
- VM (operating system), by IBM
- Membrane potential, in a cell
- Molar volume, symbol Vm
- Variola major, smallpox
- Vascular malformation, in medicine
- Vasculogenic mimicry, in medicine
- Ventromedial prefrontal cortex
- Virtual machine, an emulated computer
- Virtual memory, in computing
- Voicemail, a voice message storage system
- Vm, from virginium, erroneously claimed chemical element 87, actually francium
- An email reader for Emacs
- An extension for Apache Velocity files

== Transport ==
- Fixed-wing, aircraft in U.S. Marine Corps
- Viaggio Air (IATA airline designator VM), a private airline in Sofia, Bulgaria
- Viluppuram Junction railway station (station code VM), Tamil Nadu, India

== Other uses ==
- Väike-Maarja, Estonia
- Vasthy Mompoint (born 1980), Broadway actress
- Vayu Sena Medal, an Indian military award
- Verba Maximus, literary festival of BITS Pilani, Hyderabad Campus
- Vietnam (FIPS 10-4 and NATO obsolete country code VM)
- Virtuti Militari, a Polish military award
- Visual merchandising, presentation to maximize sales
- Voynich manuscript, written in an unknown writing system
