= VUV =

VUV may stand for:

- Vacuum UV, ultraviolet radiation that is absorbed by air
- Vanuatu vatu (ISO 4217: VUV), the official currency of Vanuatu
- A nickname for the Vuvuzela horn, commonly used in soccer games
