= Vo =

Vo or VO may refer to:

== Businesses and brands ==
- Austrian Arrows (2003–2015, IATA airline code VO)
- VLM Airlines Slovenia (2024–2025, IATA airline code VO)
- Seagram's VO Whiskey

== Language ==
- Volapük language (ISO 639-1 code vo)
- VO language, a language in which the verb typically comes before the object
- Vo (Armenian letter)

== Places ==
- Vo', a commune in the Province of Padua, Italy
- Vo, Togo, a prefecture in Togo
- Vojvodina, an autonomous province in Serbia (ISO 3166-2 code RS-VO)

== Science and technology ==
- Value Object or similarly data transfer object, in computing
- Vanadium(II) oxide, an inorganic compound
- Velocity obstacle, the set of velocities of a robot that will result in a collision with another robot
- Virtual Observatory, in astronomy
- Visual Objects, an object-oriented computer programming language

== Other uses ==
- Võ, a Vietnamese surname
- Vendetta Online, a computer game
- Virtual organization, an organization involving detached and disseminated entities
- Voice-over, a production technique in film, radio, and other media
