= VNS =

VNS is an initialism for:

== Telecommunications ==
- Victim Notification System, an automated system that notifies a victim that the perpetrator of a crime that affected them has been released
- Virtual Network Switching, a technique in telecommunications used to reduce or eliminate the number of data segments used in a command
- Virtual Network System, a network that connects all virtual machines and devices regardless of location
- Visual Navigation System
- Voice Network Switching

== Science ==
- Vagus nerve stimulation, a medical treatment used for certain types of epilepsy
- Vicarious nucleophilic substitution, a special type of nucleophilic aromatic substitution
- Visiting Nurse Service, an in-home medical care service

== Other ==
- Valley New School, a charter school in Appleton, Wisconsin, USA
- Varanasi, a city in northern India
- The IATA code of Lal Bahadur Shastri Airport, Varanasi, India
- Variable Neighborhood Search
- Viet Nam News, English-language newspaper in Vietnam
- Viqarunnisa Noon School, an all-girls higher secondary school in Dhaka, Bangladesh
- Visual Nature Studio, a Microsoft Windows program used to create photorealistic images
- Government of National Salvation (Vlada narodnog spasa), the colloquial name for the collaborationist puppet government in Serbia between 1941-1944
- Vlach National Party (Vlaška narodna stranka), a political party in Serbia
- VNS Griffins, a Philippine professional men's volleyball team
- VNS Matrix, Australian artist collective
- Voter News Service, a defunct American exit poll consortium
