= VEB =

VEB may stand for:

- Venturing and Emerging Brands, a division of Coca-Cola
- Virtual business
- Venezuelan bolívar, currency of Venezuela between 1879 and 2007, ISO 4217 code VEB
- Volkseigener Betrieb (German for "People-owned enterprise"), a state-owned workplace or establishment in the Cold-War-era East Germany
- VEB.RF, a state-owned Russian financial institution formerly known as Vnesheconombank
- Volvo Engine Brake (VEB), A modern brake technology has been used in FH-series
- Van Emde Boas tree (vEB), A dictionary data-structure.
- VEB Gustav Fischer Verlag, a subsidiary (based in Jena, Germany) of international publishing conglomerate Elsevier
