= Vice-Chief of the Defence Staff =

Vice Chief of the Defence Staff (VCDS) is a post in many militaries. It may refer to:

- Vice Chief of the Defence Force (Australia)
- Vice Chief of the Defence Staff (Canada)
- Vice Chief of Defence Force (New Zealand)
- Vice-Chief of the Defence Staff (United Kingdom)
- Vice Chief of Defence Staff (India)
