= VMF =

VMF may refer to:

- Variable Message Format, a military message format
- Abbreviation of Russian: Военно-Морской Флот, romanized: Voenno-Morskoi Flot, lit. 'Military Maritime Fleet':
  - The Soviet Navy (until 1990)
  - The Russian Navy (before 1917 and from 1991)
- East Franconian German, ISO 639-3 language code vmf
- Valve Map Format, a plain text file format used by Valve's Source engine containing uncompiled level data
