= VSOP =

VSOP may refer to:

== Music ==
- V.S.O.P. (group), a jazz group featuring Herbie Hancock
- VSOP (album), an album by Herbie Hancock
- "V.S.O.P.", a song by Above the Law from Black Mafia Life
- "V.S.O.P." (song), a song by K. Michelle from Rebellious Soul

== Acronyms ==
- Very Small Outline Package, a type of surface-mount integrated circuit package; see surface-mount technology
- Very Superior Old Pale, a grade label for brandy
- VLBI Space Observatory Programme, a Very Long Baseline Interferometry with HALCA space radio telescope
- VSOP model or Variations séculaires des orbites planétaires, mathematical theories for the calculation of the orbits and the positions of the planets
- Vienna Symphonic Orchestra Project, a series of albums performed by Vienna Symphony
- Vasuvum Saravananum Onna Padichavanga, a 2015 Indian Tamil film
