= VA =

VA is an abbreviation and country code for Vatican City State.

VA, Va, or va may also refer to:

== Places ==
- Vä, Sweden, a village
- Vatican City (ISO 3166-1 country code VA)
- Virginia, United States postal abbreviation

== Businesses and organizations ==
=== Businesses ===
- VA Software (also known as "VA Research" and "VA Linux Systems") a company that eventually became Geeknet
- VA Tech Wabag, a company with headquarters in Austria and India
- Virgin Atlantic, a worldwide airline owned by Richard Branson of the Virgin group
- Virgin Australia (IATA code since 2011)
- V Australia (IATA code 2009–2011)
- Viasa (IATA code 1960–1997)

=== Organizations ===
- United States Department of Veterans Affairs, a department of the US government
- VA (Public & Science), Swedish scientific organisation
- Vermont Academy, boarding and day high school in Saxtons River, VT
- VA, post nominal letters of the Royal Order of Victoria and Albert
- VA, nickname for the French association football club Valenciennes FC
- Virtual airline (hobby), flight simulation hobby organization
- Voluntary aided school, type of state-funded school in England and Wales
- Visual Arts (company), Japanese publishing company

== Media and entertainment ==
- Va (film), a 2010 Tamil-language movie
- Vampire Academy, series of 6 best-selling books
- Victoria & Albert Museum, more usually given as "V&A"
- Violent Apathy, punk rock band from Kalamazoo, MI
- Virtual Adepts, a "tradition" in the role-playing game Mage: The Ascension
- Virtual Analog, musical instruments that emulate analog synthesizers
- Visual arts
- Voice actor, actor who provides voices for animated characters or non-visual media

== Science, technology, and mathematics ==
=== Biology and medicine ===
- Valproic acid, an often-used anticonvulsant and mood-stabilizing drug
- Vascular anomaly, in medicine
- Ventral anterior nucleus, a component of the thalamus in the central nervous system
- Ventricular arrhythmia
- Visual acuity, a quantitative measure of visual perception

=== Computing and systems ===
- .va, the country code top level domain (ccTLD) for the State of the Vatican City
- Validation Authority, in public key infrastructure
- Virtual address, a computer memory location in virtual address space
- Vertical alignment, a technology used in a modern liquid-crystal display
- Visual analytics, business intelligence visualization tools
- Vulnerability assessment, the process of identifying and quantifying vulnerabilities in a system

=== Mathematics and physics ===
- Vertex algebra
- Vertical asymptote, in mathematics
- Volt-ampere, the SI unit of apparent power measurement, equivalent to the watt
- Vertical angle

=== Electronics ===
- VA (voltage), a positive supply voltage

=== Space and aviation ===
- V_{A}, the design maneuvering speed of an aircraft
- Vozvraschaemyi Apparat or VA spacecraft, a Soviet reentry vehicle

== Other uses ==
- Various Artists, used in the description of a music album which contains tracks that have been compiled from several different artists
- Va people, an ethnic group in China and Myanmar
- Value added, in economics
- Variable annuity, a financial instrument
- Vice admiral, a military rank
- Virtual assistant, an independent contractor providing assistance to clients via the internet
- Volatile acidity or vinegar taint, high acetic acidity in wine
- Amateur radio callsign prefix for Canada, e.g. as in "VA1BOB", see Call signs in Canada
- Vá (footballer), Angolan footballer
- MG VA, a car manufactured by MG
