= Vibratory stress relief =

Metal-working process

Vibratory Stress Relief, often abbreviated VSR, is a non-thermal stress relief method used by the metalworking industry to enhance the dimensional stability and mechanical integrity of castings, forgings, and welded components, chiefly for two categories of these metal workpieces:

- Precision components, which are machined or aligned to tight dimensional or geometric tolerances. Examples include machine tool bases or columns, components of paper mills, mining equipment, or other large-scale processing machinery, and centrifuge rotors.
- Heavily loaded metal workpieces, which are components designed and built with the ability to withstand heavy loads. Examples include lifting yokes, clamshell buckets, crane bases, vibratory screening system frames, ingot processing equipment, and rolling-mill equipment.

This stress is called residual stress, because it remains in a solid material after the original cause of the stress has been removed. Residual stresses can occur through a variety of mechanisms including inelastic (plastic) deformations, temperature gradients (during thermal cycle), or structural changes (phase transformation). For example, heat from welding may cause localized expansion, which is taken up during welding by either the molten metal or the placement of parts being welded. When the finished weldment cools, some areas cool and contract more than others, leaving residual stresses. These stresses often lead to distortion or warping of the structure during machining, assembly, testing, transport, field use, or over time. In extreme cases, residual stress can cause structural failure.

Almost all vibratory stress-relief equipment manufacturers and procedures use the workpiece's own resonant frequency to boost the loading experienced by induced vibration, to maximize the degree of stress relief achieved. Some equipment and procedures are designed to operate near, but not at, workpiece resonances (perhaps to extend equipment life). Although, independent research has consistently shown resonant frequency vibration to be more effective. See references 4, 6, and 9.

The effectiveness of vibratory stress relief is highly questionable. In general, the strain amplitudes achieved during vibratory stress relief are too low to exceed the critical stress required to activate mechanical relaxation during the induced low-amplitude high-cycle fatigue excitation of the transducer vibrations. If the strain amplitudes were increased to a level sufficient to cause instability in the residual stresses, fatigue damage would occur. For most applications, conventional stress-relief methodologies should be applied to components that require the reduction of residual stresses.

== Criteria for effective VSR treatment ==
Effective vibratory stress-relief treatment results from a combination of factors:

1. Material condition: The material must be ductile. Metal in the welded, cast, forged, or hot-rolled condition can be treated. Material that has been severely cold-rolled or through-hardened, which renders the metal non-ductile, will resist effective treatment.
2. Component geometry: Large workpieces lend themselves well to vibratory stress relief, likely due to their being more able to be resonated; however a variety of modest-sized workpieces (overall size less than 20 inches or 510 millimetres) have been effectively stress relieved, using vibration.
3. Setup for VSR treatment involves several steps.
- Placing workpiece upon load cushions. These cushions should be made of soft-yet-resilient material, typically urethane or neoprene. The cushions should be placed away from the corners of the workpiece, so that workpiece damping is minimized, which promotes increased resonant response to vibration.
- Positioning, orienting, and securely clamping vibrator on workpiece. The vibrator should be placed away from the corners of the workpiece, and oriented so that the force-field output of the vibrator, with rotary vibrators a plane perpendicular to the vibrator’s axis of rotation, can drive the workpiece into resonance. Dual-mount flanged vibrators are helpful in achieving effective orientation. The vibrator must be securely clamped, typically with machinist-grade clamps or high-tensile bolts.
- Positioning and orienting vibration sensor. The best location for this sensor is on one of the corners of the workpiece, and in-line with the force-plane of the vibrator (a plane perpendicular to the vibrator’s axis of rotation [AOR]).
- Adjustment of the vibrator unbalance. The unbalance of the vibrator should be sufficient to drive the resonances of the workpiece, minimally to a level of a few gees of acceleration. The unbalance might require further increase, to cause peak growth (discussed later) during stress relief treatment.

4. Finding resonance(s). The vibrator speed range must reach high enough to be greater than the resonance(s) of the workpiece. A max speed capability of at least 6000–8000 RPM is recommended. Equally important is tight vibrator motor speed regulation (±0.25%), which greatly improves the ability to detect and drive the resonance(s) (abilities that are required for stress relieving to occur). Driving a resonance involves tuning the vibrator speed to the top of the resonance peak. This is increasingly challenging as workpiece rigidity increases, which causes resonances to become very narrow. To record such resonances, a slow, automated scan through the speed range and plotting of the vibration response of the workpiece is made.

The scan rate must be slow, not only because the resonance peaks are narrow, but also due to the high inertia of the workpiece. There is a significant time delay, caused by this high workpiece inertia, in the response to vibration. This can be best explained by first looking at the phenomenon known as ring time. Ring time is defined as the time period a resonating body continues to vibrate after resonant excitation is stopped. When the vibration is stopped, the waveform will decay, ie, reduce in amplitude, due to frictional losses. See Figure 1

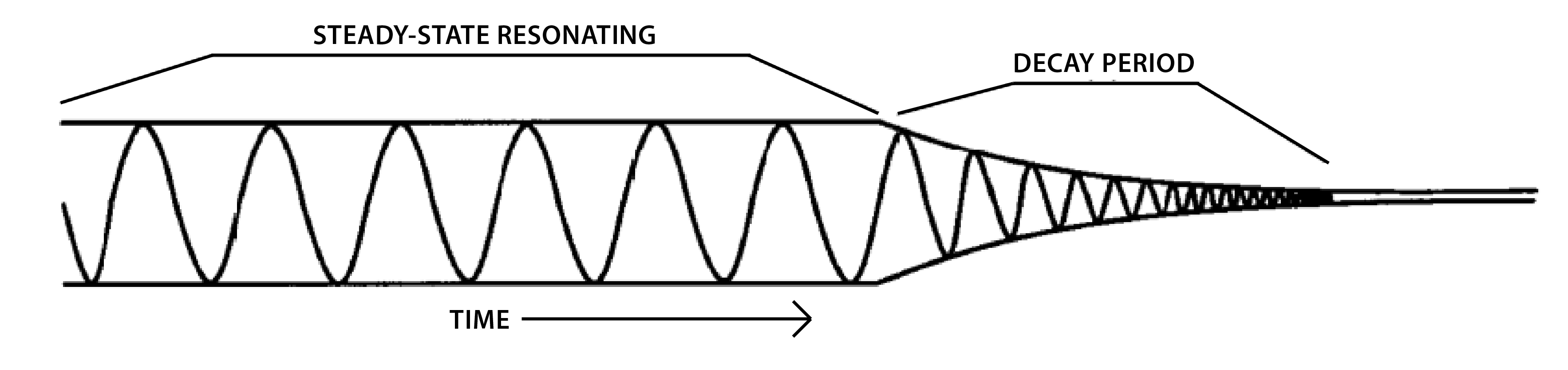
Figure 1: A waveform that demonstrates ring time, which is the time period vibration continues, after resonant excitation ceases.

Most people have experienced ring time. A large bell, after being struck, continues to emit sound, but at decreasing (softer) sound levels. Over time, the sound level dissipates, as the vibration amplitude decays to an undetectable level.

When vibration is the excitation causing resonance (rather than a hammer blow [such as the strike of a bell]), there is a time period between the beginning of vibration excitation, and the moment when full resonant amplitude is reached. During this time, the amplitude is building-up or growing (the reverse of decaying), so this phenomenon is called reverse ring time, or RRT. For large metal structures that are commonly stress-relieved with vibration, ring or reverse ring times (the time periods are the same, whether the amplitude is growing or decaying), can be 20–40 seconds or longer. See Figure 2.

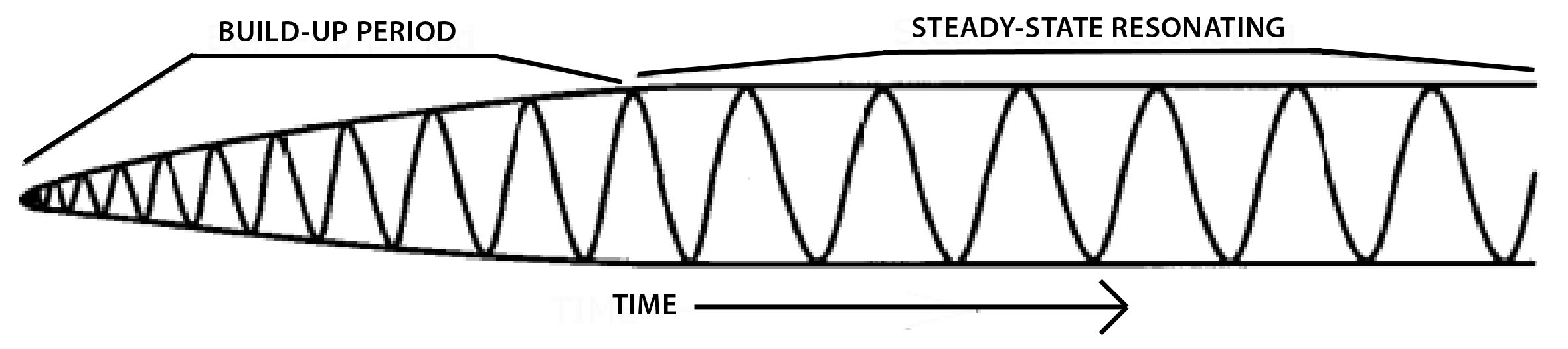
Figure 2: Reverse ring time, or RRT, is the time period between the start of vibration excitation, and full resonant amplitude.

The most frequently used method of finding the resonances of a workpiece during vibratory stress relief is to scan through the vibrator speed range, and record / plot the vibration amplitude vs. the vibrator speed. The effect of RRT, specifically the time delay between the beginning of resonant vibration and full resonant amplitude being achieved, dictates that the scan rate used to sweep through the vibrator speed range be slow, in order to make an accurate record of the resonance pattern. Scanning too quickly will result in resonant peaks not being fully depicted or being missed entirely, since the workpiece will not have sufficient time to reach full amplitude resonance before the vibrator speed increases (due to scanning) beyond the resonance frequency.

A scan rate of 10 RPM/second has been found in practice to result in the accurate detection of resonant peaks in many workpieces. As workpiece size increases, the scan rate might need to be decreased, in order to fully capture accurate resonance data. See Figure 3.

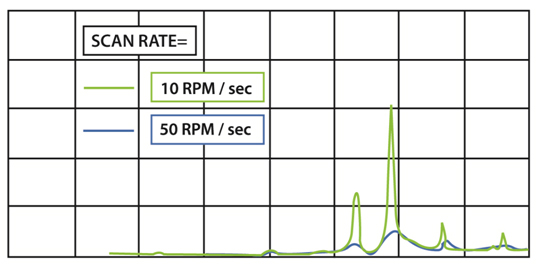
Figure 3: The effects of scanning at different scan rates: 10 and 50-RPM/sec. Peaks that are scanned too quickly don't have enough time to reach full resonant amplitude, due to the RRT effect. The larger and heavier the structure, the greater the inertia, the longer the ring time (and reverse ring time): Thus, larger, heavier structures might require slower scan rates to plot accurate resonance patterns.

5. Tuning vibrator speed. The vibrator speed is then tuned upon the resonance(s) recorded during the scan, and the response of the workpiece to vibration is monitored. Fine tuning of the speed, plus tight speed regulation, enhances peak tuning and tracking capabilities. The most common responses to treatment are:

Peak growth – Typically the larger change.
Peak shift, in the direction of lower RPM – Percentage-wise, the smaller change. Typically, resonance peaks are very narrow, causing any peak shifting to rapidly decrease the vibration amplitude, and hence, rapidly decrease the rate of stress relief, since the resonant amplitude is more effective in relieving stress. Thus, any peak shifting requires fine-tuning adjustment of the vibrator speed, in order to track the peak to its final, stable position.

Each of these changes, which often combine (for example, peak growth and shifting), is consistent with a lowering of the rigidity of the workpiece. The workpiece rigidity is inflated by the presence of residual stress. In the example below, which depicts a common resonance pattern change that occurs during vibratory stress relief, the large peak grew by 47%, while simultaneously shifting to the left by 28 RPM, which is less than 0.75%. See Figure 4. The equipment used to perform this stress relief had vibrator speed regulation of ± 0.02%, and speed increment fine-tuning of 1 RPM, which allowed even subtle shifting of the peaks to be accurately tracked to their final, stable locale.

The pattern of change, i.e., how quickly the peaks grow and shift, is faster at the beginning of vibration treatment: as treatment continues, the rate of change decreases, eventually resulting in a new, stable resonance pattern. Stability of this new resonance pattern indicates that dimensional stability of the workpiece has been achieved.

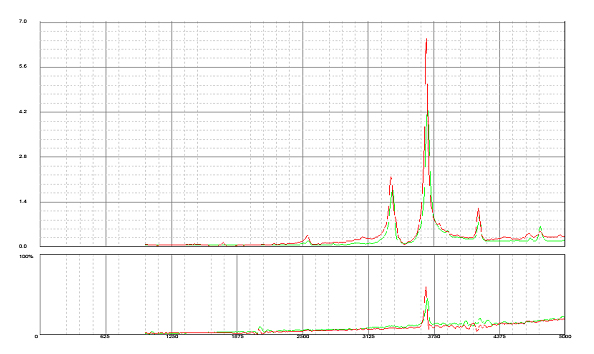
Figure 4: VSR Treatment Chart consists of two plots: The upper plot is workpiece acceleration, the lower plot is vibrator input power, simultaneously plotted vertically vs. a common horizontal axis of vibrator speed. Peaks in the acceleration data depict resonances; growth and shifting of the peaks are the response of the workpiece to treatment.

The power plot is useful in both positioning and orienting the vibrator, and when adjusting the vibrator unbalance. Poor or inappropriate vibrator locations or orientations, or excessive vibrator unbalance settings, cause large peaks in the power plot. Use of higher-powered vibrator motors (above 2 kW) provides more "headroom" for peaks in power to be tolerated, and treatment to take place, which was the case here: the power peak at ≈ 3700 RPM was only half of the vibrator motor's 2.3-kW power capacity (top of the power scale).

A pre-treatment scan, which functions as a baseline, is first recorded in green. The operator uses this green data set to tune upon the resonances, and monitor the growth and shifting of the resonance peaks. After peak growth and shifting have subsided, a post-treatment scan is made (red). This data is superimposed on the original, green, pre-treatment scan data, documenting the changes in resonance pattern. The stress relief treatment resulted in 47% growth of the original, large peak, while it shifted to the left 28 RPM (less than 0.75%).

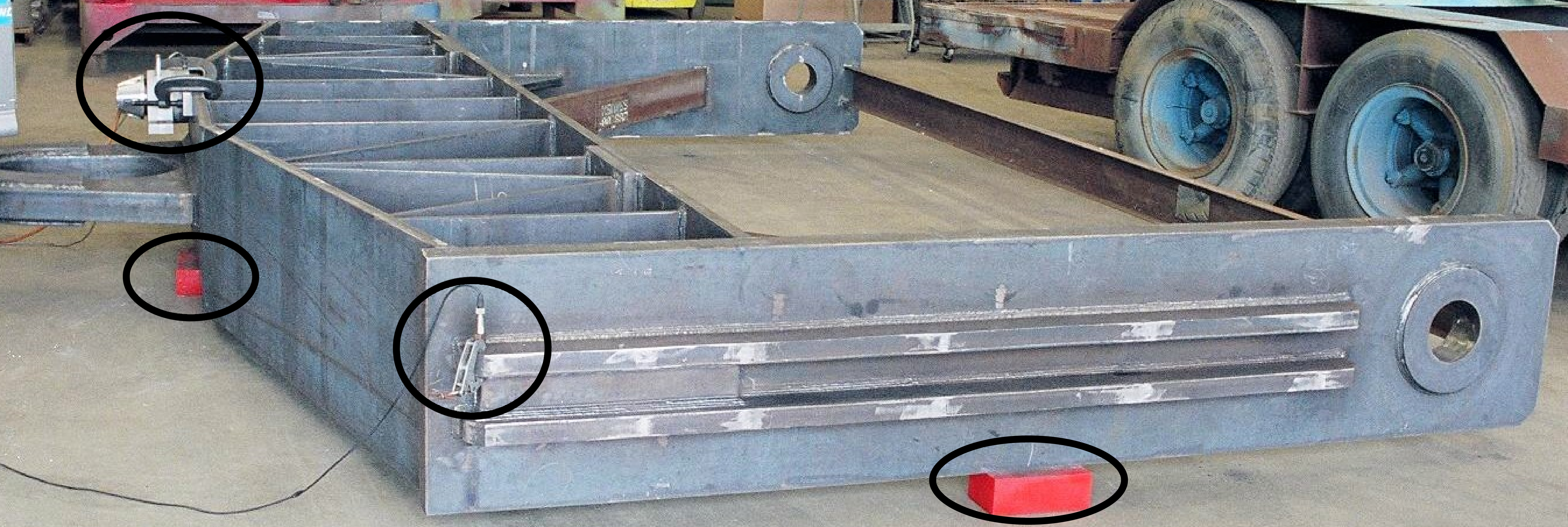
Figure 5: Vibratory stress relief was performed on this mild steel weldment weighing almost 12 tons. Overall size was 17' × 15' × 2' (≈ 5.2 × 5.6 × 0.6 meters). Workpiece was supported on three red urethane load cushions (two of which are circled), which are positioned far from the corners of the workpiece to minimize damping, thus promoting resonance, which is required for stress relief to be achieved. The vibrator can be seen in the left, mid-ground (circled), and the accelerometer can be seen in the central, left, foreground (circled).

After stress-relief treatment, the braces (rust-colored, structural beams), which are used to maintain the desired shape during welding, were removed. The spacing between the two "arms" remained the same; no change was detectable (measured to 1/32 inch or 0.79 millimetres), and the spacing remained so throughout assembly, testing (to 60-ton test loads), transport, and installation.

== When VSR should be considered and the limits of TSR ==
VSR is not accepted by the engineering community at large as a viable method of relaxing or reducing residual stresses in components that require it. For general use, conventional residual stress relaxation methodologies are recommended.

Historically, the first type of stress relief was performed on castings by storing them outside for months or even years. This was referred to as curing, a term used for long-term storage of freshly hewn wood. Fresh castings were referred to as being green, meaning, they were prone to distortion during precision machining, just as green wood bows during cutting.

Later, thermal stress relief (TSR) was developed to alleviate the lengthy time requirements of curing. It has been known for many years, however, that TSR has limitations or shortcomings, specifically:

- Furnace size: workpieces can be too large to fit.
- Not effective on all alloys, among them austenitic stainless steels.
- Should not be used on welded structures made of low-carbon, high-strength steels, which can suffer loss of physical properties and/or crack initiation if thermally stress relieved.
- Cannot be used on workpieces that have been quenched and tempered (Q&T) without risking loss of physical properties. Vibratory stress relief can be successfully applied, if some level of ductility is present after Q&T, together with acceptable workpiece geometry (which determines resonant vibration frequency required).
- Often not suitable for rough-machined components, due to difficulty in removing scale (rust-colored skin that develops on ferrous components while in-furnace), without damaging machined surfaces.
- Asymmetrically shaped workpieces, which are difficult to cool while maintaining uniform temperature, can develop new, unacceptably high-level, residual stress patterns during the last stage of TSR. Cooling rates can be slowed, but with increased costs.

Metal components, whose function would be enhanced by stress relief, and fall into one or more of the above categories, are strong candidates for VSR for quality-related reasons.

Further, there is a strong economic incentive to use vibratory stress relief on large workpieces, since stress relief using a furnace (thermal stress relief or TSR) is highly energy-intensive, consuming much natural gas, and hence, producing much CO_{2}. The cost of TSR is approximately proportional to a metal component's weight or overall size, estimated to be US$2,500 for the structure pictured, plus transportation costs, which might involve special transport permits, to and from a furnace. VSR treatment would cost a company owning appropriate equipment less than 15% as much (≈ $400) as TSR treatment, chiefly amortization of equipment investment plus labor, and a modest amount of electrical consumption, and treatment would take less than two hours, with no transport required. However, the lack of independent data to show that this technique is effective may mean that even that lesser investment is not of any value, so use of VSR should evaluated very carefully before proceeding.
