= Voice of China (disambiguation) =

Voice of China, or China Media Group, is the predominant state radio and television broadcaster in the People's Republic of China.

Voice of China may also refer to:

- The Voice of China, Chinese reality television singing competition
- The Voice of China (radio channel), radio channel of China National Radio
- Voice of Free China, international broadcasting station of the Republic of China from 1949 until 1998
