= VFR =

VFR may refer to:

- Honda VFR, a motorcycle model series
- Variable frame rate, a video format feature
- Verein für Raumschiffahrt, a German amateur rocketry society, 1927–1933
- Visiting friends and relatives, in international travel
- Visual flight rules, a set of aviation regulations for flying in visual weather conditions
