= VNM =

VNM may refer to:

- Vietnam, ISO 3166-1 alpha3 country code
- Von Neumann–Morgenstern utility theorem
- Vadodara News Magazine
- VNM (rapper), Polish hip hop artist (pl)
