= F5 (classification) =

Wheelchair sport classification

F5, also SP5, is a wheelchair sport classification that corresponds to the neurological level T8 - L1. Historically, it was known as Lower 3, or Upper 4. People in this class have some trunk function and good sitting balance. They have problems with hip function, that reduces their ability to rotate their spines.

The comparable class for athletics is F55. F5 competitors can be found in a number of swimming classes including SB3, S4, SB4, SB5, S5 and S6. People in this class would likely be a 2 point player in wheelchair basketball. In rowing, they would be classified as AS. The process for classification into this class has a medical and functional classification process. This process is often sport specific.

== Definition ==
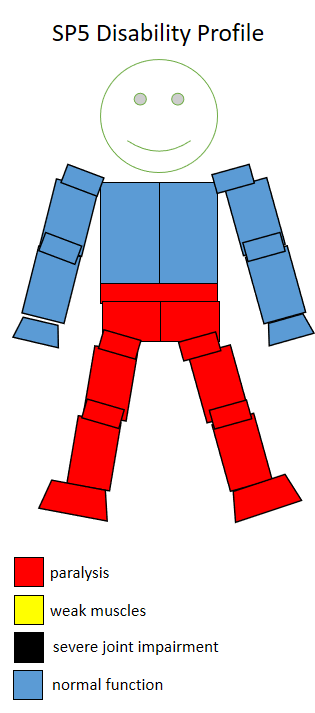
Functional profile of a wheelchair sportsperson in the F5 class.

This is wheelchair sport classification that corresponds to the neurological level T8 - L1. In the past, this class was known as Lower 3, or Upper 4.

In 2002, USA Track & Field defined this class as, " Three trunk movements may be seen in this class: 1) off the back of the chair (in an upward direction); 2) movement in the forward and backward plane; and 3) some trunk rotation. They have fair to good sitting balance. They do not have functional hip movement, so do not have the ability to lift the thigh upward in sitting. They may have stiffness of their spine that improves balance, but reduces the ability to rotate the spine. With the shot and javelin, they tend to use forward and backward movements, whereas with the discus they predominantly use a rotary movement. Neurological level: T8-L1."

=== Neurological ===
The neurological definition of this class in 2003 as T8 - L1. The location of lesions on different vertebrae tend to be associated with disability levels and functionality issues. T12 and L1 are associated with abdominal innervation complete.

=== Anatomical ===
Disabled Sports USA defined the anatomical definition of this class in 2003 as, "Normal upper limb function. Have abdominal muscles and spinal extensors (upper or more commonly upper and lower). May have non-functional hip flexors (grade 1). Have no abductor function."

=== Functional ===
People in this class have good sitting balance. People with lesions located between T9 and T12 have some loss of abdominal muscle control. Disabled Sports USA defined the functional definition of this class in 2003 as, "Three trunk movements may be seen in this class: 1) Off the back of a chair (in an upwards direction). 2) Movement in the backwards and forwards plane. 3) Some trunk rotation. They have fair to good sitting balance. They cannot have functional hip flexors, i.e. ability to lift the thigh upwards in the sitting position. They may have stiffness of the spine that improves balance but reduces the ability to rotate the spine." People in this class have a total respiratory capacity of 87% compared to people without a disability.

== Governance ==
In general, classification for spinal cord injuries and wheelchair sport is overseen by International Wheelchair and Amputee Sports Federation (IWAS), having taken over this role following the 2005 merger of ISMWSF and ISOD. From the 1950s to the early 2000s, wheelchair sport classification was handled International Stoke Mandeville Games Federation (ISMGF).

Some sports have classification managed by other organizations. In the case of athletics, classification is handled by IPC Athletics. Wheelchair rugby classification has been managed by the International Wheelchair Rugby Federation since 2010. Lawn bowls is handled by International Bowls for the Disabled. Wheelchair fencing is governed by IWAS Wheelchair Fencing (IWF). The International Paralympic Committee manages classification for a number of spinal cord injury and wheelchair sports including alpine skiing, biathlon, cross country skiing, ice sledge hockey, powerlifting, shooting, swimming, and wheelchair dance.

Some sports specifically for people with disabilities, like race running, have two governing bodies that work together to allow different types of disabilities to participate. Race running is governed by both the CPISRA and IWAS, with IWAS handling sportspeople with spinal cord related disabilities.

Classification is also handled at the national level or at the national sport specific level. In the United States, this has been handled by Wheelchair Sports, USA (WSUSA) who managed wheelchair track, field, slalom, and long-distance events. For wheelchair basketball in Canada, classification is handled by Wheelchair Basketball Canada.

== History ==
Early on in this classes history, the class had a different name and was based on medical classification and originally intended for athletics. During the 1960s and 1970s, classification involved being examined in a supine position on an examination table, where multiple medical classifiers would often stand around the player, poke and prod their muscles with their hands and with pins. The system had no built in privacy safeguards and players being classified were not insured privacy during medical classification nor with their medical records.

During the late 1960s, people oftentimes tried to cheat classification to get in classified more favorably. The group most likely to try to cheat at classification were wheelchair basketball players with complete spinal cord injuries located at the high thoracic transection of the spine. Starting in the 1980s and going into the 1990s, this class began to be more defined around functional classification instead of a medical one.

== Sports ==
=== Athletics ===
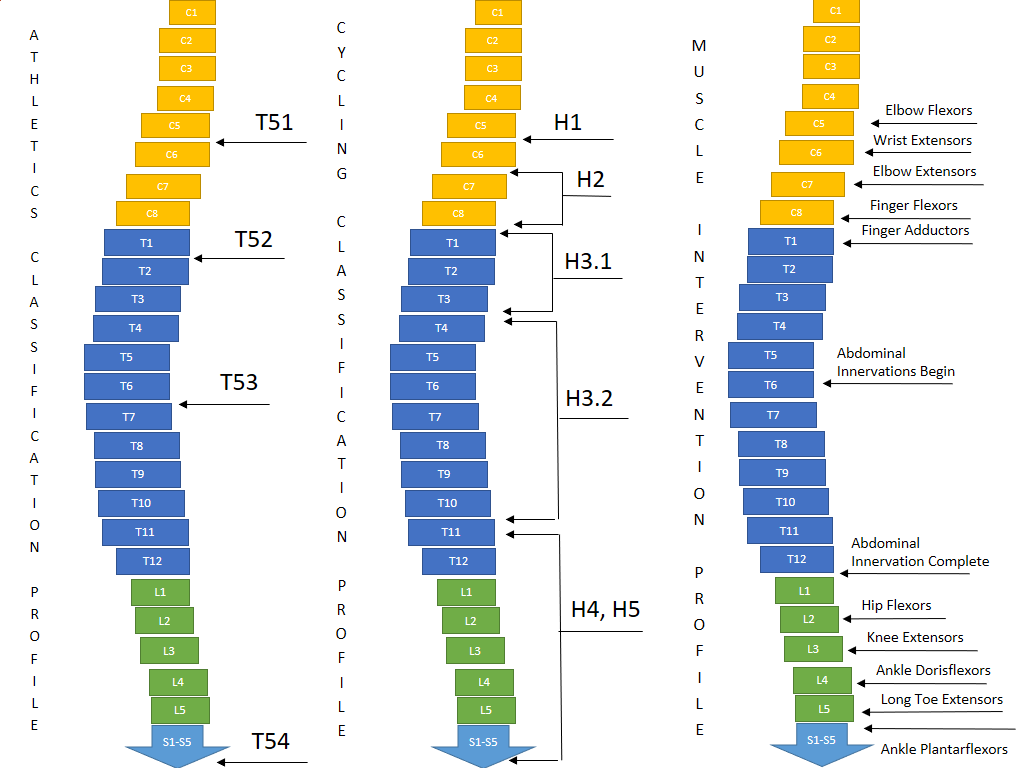
Comparing key muscle innervations for spinal cord levels compared to cycling and athletics classifications.

Under the IPC Athletics classification system, this class competes in F55. Field events open to this class have included shot put, discus and javelin. In pentathlon, the events for this class have included Shot, Javelin, 200m, Discus, 1500m. F5 athletes throw from a seated position, and use a javelin that weighs .6 kilograms (1.3 lb). The shot put used by women in this class weighs less than the traditional one at 3 kilograms (6.6 lb). Athletes in this class who good trunk control and mobility have an advantage over athletes in the same class who have less functional trunk control and mobility. This functional difference can cause different performance results within the same class, with discus throwers with more control in a class able to throw the discus further.

There are performance differences and similarities between this class and other wheelchair classes. A study of javelin throwers in 2003 found that F5 throwers have angular speeds of the shoulder girdle similar to that of F3 to F9 throwers. A 1999 study of discus throwers found that for F5 to F8 discus throwers, the upper arm tends to be near horizontal at the moment of release of the discus. F5 to F7 discus throwers have greater angular speed of the shoulder girdle during release of the discus than the lower number classes of F2 to F4. F5 and F8 discus throwers have less average angular forearm speed than F2 and F4 throwers. F2 and F4 speed is caused by use of the elbow flexion to compensate for the shoulder flexion advantage of F5 to F8 throwers.

A study of was done comparing the performance of athletics competitors at the 1984 Summer Paralympics. It found there was little significant difference in performance in distance between women in 1C (SP3, SP4), 2 (SP4) and 3 (SP4, SP5) in the javelin. It found there was little significant difference in performance in time between women in 1C (SP3, SP4), 2 (SP4) and 3 in the 60 meters. It found there was little significant difference in performance in distance between women in 2 (SP4) and 3 in the discus. It found there was little significant difference in performance in distance between women in 2 (SP4) and 3 in the shot put. It found there was little significant difference in performance in time between women in 2 (SP4) and 3 in the 60 meters. It found there was little significant difference in performance in time between women in 2 (SP4) and 3 in the 200 meters. It found there was little significant difference in performance in time between women in 2 (SP4) and 3 in the 400 meters. It found there was little significant difference in performance in time between women in 2 (SP4) and 3 in the slalom. It found there was little significant difference in performance in distance between men in 2 (SP4) and 3 in the discus. It found there was little significant difference in performance in distance between men in 2 (SP4) and 3 in the javelin. It found there was little significant difference in performance in distance between men in 2 (SP4) and 3 in the shot put. It found there was little significant difference in performance in time between men in 2 (SP4) and 3 in the 100 meters. It found there was little significant difference in performance in time between men in 2 (SP4) and 3 in the 200 meters. It found there was little significant difference in performance in time between men in 2 (SP4) and 3 in the 400 meters. It found there was little significant difference in performance in distance between women in 2 (SP4), 3 and 4 in the discus. It found there was little significant difference in performance in time between men in 2 (SP4), 3 and 4 in the 100 meters. It found there was little significant difference in performance in distance between women in 2 (SP4), 3, 4,5 and 6 in the discus. It found there was little significant difference in performance in time between men in 3, 4,5 and 6 in the 200 meters. It found there was little significant difference in performance in time between women in 3, 4 and 5 in the 60 meters. It found there was little significant difference in performance in distance between men in 3 and 4 in the javelin. It found there was little significant difference in performance in distance between men in 3 and 4 in the shot put. It found there was little significant difference in performance in distance between women in 4, 5 and 6 in the discus. It found there was little significant difference in performance in distance between women in 4, 5 and 6 in the javelin. It found there was little significant difference in performance in distance between women in 4, 5 and 6 in the shot put. It found there was little significant difference in performance in distance between women in 4, 5 and 6 in the discus. It found there was little significant difference in performance in time between women in 4, 5 and 6 in the 60 meters. It found there was little significant difference in performance in time between women in 4, 5 and 6 in the 800 meters. It found there was little significant difference in performance in time between women in 4, 5 and 6 in the 1,500 meters. It found there was little significant difference in performance in time between women in 4, 5 and 6 in the slalom. It found there was little significant difference in performance in distance between men in 4, 5 and 6 in the discus. It found there was little significant difference in performance in distance between men in 4, 5 and 6 in the shot put. It found there was little significant difference in performance in time between men in 4, 5 and 6 in the 100 meters. It found there was little significant difference in performance in time between men in 4, 5 and 6 in the 800 meters. It found there was little significant difference in performance in time between men in 4, 5 and 6 in the 1,500 meters. It found there was little significant difference in performance in time between men in 4, 5 and 6 in the slalom.

=== Rowing ===
Rowing is one of the sports available to F5 competitors. Currently, people with a complete spinal cord injury at T12 level or incomplete at T10 compete in AS. This class is for people who use their arms and shoulders to row. They have decreased balance while rowing. They row largely using their arms and shoulders to gain propulsion in the water They are required to use a chest strap, a knee strap, pontoons on their boat and short oars to prevent overlap. In 1991, the first internationally accepted adaptive rowing classification system was established and put into use. People from this class were initially classified as P1 for people with lesions at T2-T9 or P2 for people with lesions at T10-L4.

=== Swimming ===
Swimmers in this class compete in a number of IPC swimming classes. These include SB3, S4, SB4, SB5, S5 and S6. Swimming classification is done based on a total points system, with a variety of functional and medical tests being used as part of a formula to assign a class. Part of this test involves the Adapted Medical Research Council (MRC) scale. For upper trunk extension, T6 - T10 are given 3 - 5 points.

People in SB3 tend to be incomplete tetraplegics below C7, complete paraplegics around T1 - T5, or complete paraplegics at T1 - T8 with surgical rods put in their spinal column from T4 to T6. These rods impact their lumbar function and their balance. People in SB4 tend to be complete paraplegics below T6 to T10, complete paraplegics at T9 - L1 with surgical rods put in their spinal column from T4 to T6 which affects their balance, or incomplete tetraplegics below C8 with decent trunk function. S5 swimmers with spinal cord injuries tend to be complete paraplegics with lesions below T1 to T8, or incomplete tetraplegics below C8 who have decent trunk control. These swimmers have full use of their arms and are able to use their arms, hands and fingers to gain propulsion in the catch phase of swimming. Because they have minimal trunk control, their hips tend to be a bit lower in the water and they have leg drag. They either start in the water or start from a sitting dive position. They use their hands to make turns. People in SB5 tend to be complete paraplegics below T11 to L1 who cannot use their legs for swimming, or complete paraplegics at L2 to L3 with surgical rods put in their spinal column from T4 to T6 which affects their balance. S6 swimmers with spinal cord injuries tend to be complete paraplegics with lesions below T9 to L1 and where their leg function does not assist them in swimming. S6 swimmers of this type have effect arm cycling and can use their hands and fingers to gain propulsion during the catch phase. Their hips may ride slightly lower in the water, but their legs are not in a V position. They may start either in the water or from a sitting dive position. They turn using their hands.

A study of was done comparing the performance of athletics competitors at the 1984 Summer Paralympics. It found there was little significant difference in performance times between women in 2 (SP4) and 3 (SP4, SP5) in the 50m breaststroke. It found there was little significant difference in performance times between men in 2 (SP4) and 3 (SP4, SP5) in the 50m breaststroke. It found there was little significant difference in performance times between women in 2 (SP4) and 3 (SP4, SP5) in the 50m freestyle. It found there was little significant difference in performance times between men in 2 (SP4) and 3 (SP4, SP5) in the 50m freestyle. It found there was little significant difference in performance times between men in 2 (SP4) and 3 (SP4, SP5) in the 50m backstroke. It found there was little significant difference in performance times between women in 4 (SP5, SP6), 5 (SP6, SP7) and 6 (SP7) in the 100m breaststroke. It found there was little significant difference in performance times between women in 4 (SP5, SP6), 5 (SP6, SP7) and 6 (SP7) in the 100m backstroke. It found there was little significant difference in performance times between women in 4 (SP5, SP6), 5 (SP6, SP7) and 6 (SP7) in the 100m freestyle. It found there was little significant difference in performance times between women in 4 (SP5, SP6), 5 (SP6, SP7) and 6 (SP7) in the 14 x 50 m individual medley. It found there was little significant difference in performance times between men in 4 (SP5, SP6), 5 (SP6, SP7) and 6 (SP7) in the 100m backstroke. It found there was little significant difference in performance times between men in 4 (SP5, SP6), 5 (SP6, SP7) and 6 (SP7) in the 100m breaststroke. It found there was little significant difference in performance times between women in 2 (SP4), 3 (SP4, SP5) and 4 (SP5, SP6) in the 25 m butterfly. It found there was little significant difference in performance times between men in 2 (SP4), 3 (SP4, SP5) and 4 (SP5, SP6) in the 25 m butterfly.

=== Wheelchair basketball ===
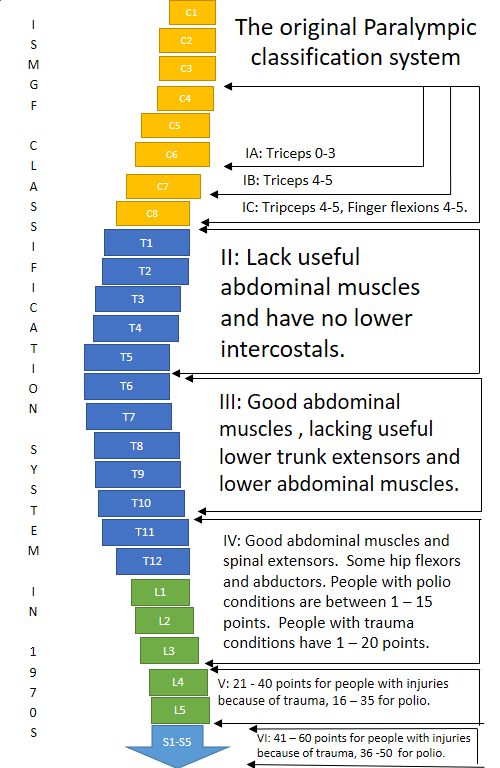
The original ISMGF classification system used at early Paralympic Games.

The original wheelchair basketball classification system in 1966 had 5 classes: A, B, C, D, S. Each class was worth so many points. A was worth 1, B and C were worth 2. D and S were worth 3 points. A team could have a maximum of 12 points on the floor. This system was the one in place for the 1968 Summer Paralympics. Class A was for T1-T9 complete. Class B was for T1-T9 incomplete. Class C was for T10-L2 complete. Class D was for T10-L2 incomplete. Class S was for Cauda equina paralysis. This class would have been part of Class A, Class B, Class C or Class D.

From 1969 to 1973, a classification system designed by Australian Dr. Bedwell was used. This system used some muscle testing to determine which class incomplete paraplegics should be classified in. It used a point system based on the ISMGF classification system. Class IA, IB and IC were worth 1 point. Class II for people with lesions between T1-T5 and no balance were also worth 1 point. Class III for people with lesions at T6-T10 and have fair balance were worth 1 point. Class IV was for people with lesions at T11-L3 and good trunk muscles. They were worth 2 points. Class V was for people with lesions at L4 to L5 with good leg muscles. Class IV was for people with lesions at S1-S4 with good leg muscles. Class V and IV were worth 3 points. The Daniels/Worthington muscle test was used to determine who was in class V and who was class IV. Paraplegics with 61 to 80 points on this scale were not eligible. A team could have a maximum of 11 points on the floor. The system was designed to keep out people with less severe spinal cord injuries, and had no medical basis in many cases. This class would have been III or IV.

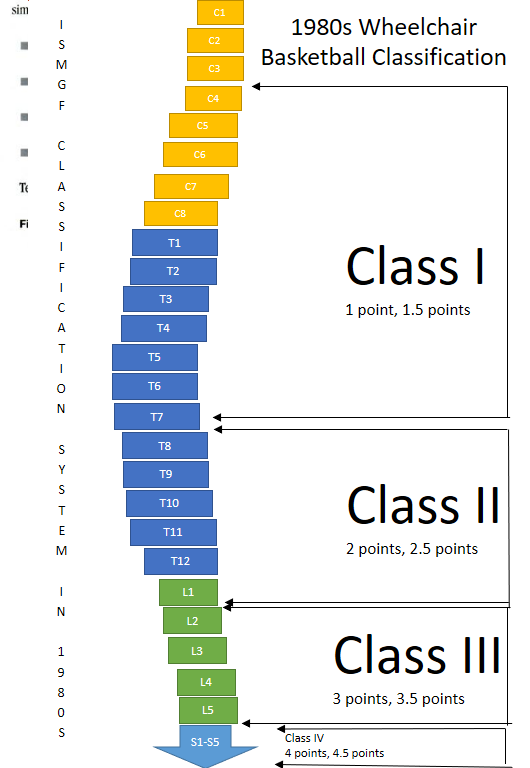
The wheelchair basketball classification system used during the 1980s was mostly functional, but had medical lesion based elements as a guideline. A maximum of 14 points was allowed on the floor at any time.

In 1982, wheelchair basketball finally made the move to a functional classification system internationally. While the traditional medical system of where a spinal cord injury was located could be part of classification, it was only one advisory component. A maximum of 14 points was allowed on the court at a time. People in this class would have been Class II as 2 or 2.5 point players. Under the current classification system, people in this class would likely be a 2 point player.

=== Wheelchair fencing ===
Generally, people in this class are classified as 2 or 3. Wheelchair fencers from this class who are classified as 2 generally are a paraplegic type D1 - D9, scoring less than 4 points on Type 1 and Type 2 function tests. They may have a minimal impairment in their dominant fencing hand, but otherwise have good sitting balance. Fencers classified as 3 are paraplegics from D10 to L2, scoring between 5 and 9 points on Type 1 and Type 2 function tests. For international IWF sanctioned competitions, classes are combined. 3 and 4 are combined, competing as Category A. 2 is referred to as Category B.

=== Other sports ===
One of the sports open to people in this class is archery. People in this class compete in ARW2. This class is for people who have limited to good trunk function and normal functioning in their arms. It includes paraplegic archers, while ARW1 includes tetraplegic archers.

Ten-pin bowling is another sport open to people in this class, where they compete in TPB8. People in this class do not have more than 70 points for functionality, have normal arm pitch for throwing and use a wheelchair. People in this class participate can participate in sit skiing. In the United States, domestic competitions have used different classification than the one used internationally. Two groups are used instead of LW10 to LW12. Group 1 is for people from T5 to T10. Group 2 is for people with lesions above T5.

== Getting classified ==
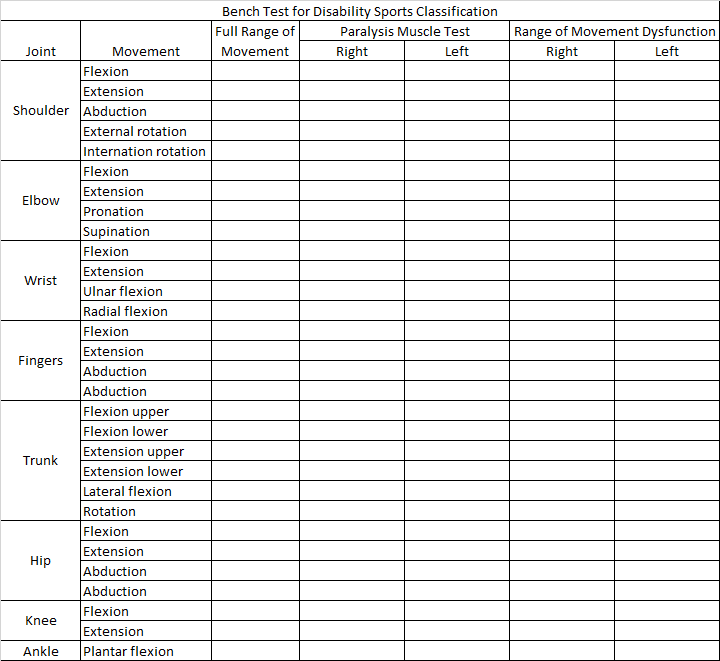
A standard bench press form used to for functional classification for wheelchair sportspeople.

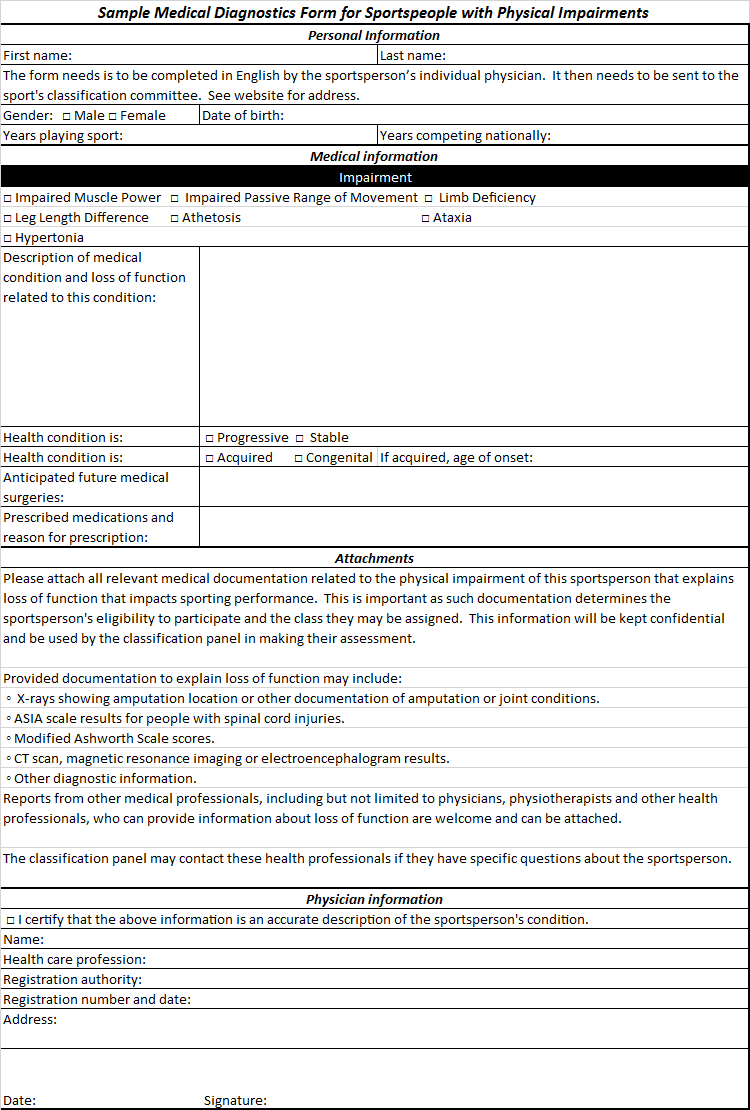
A sample medical classification form. Sportspeople would need some form of this sent to a classification panel.

Classification is often sport specific, and has two parts: a medical classification process and a functional classification process.

Medical classification for wheelchair sport can consist of medical records being sent to medical classifiers at the international sports federation. The sportsperson's physician may be asked to provide extensive medical information including medical diagnosis and any loss of function related to their condition. This includes if the condition is progressive or stable, if it is an acquired or congenital condition. It may include a request for information on any future anticipated medical care. It may also include a request for any medications the person is taking. Documentation that may be required my include x-rays, ASIA scale results, or Modified Ashworth Scale scores.

One of the standard means of assessing functional classification is the bench test, which is used in swimming, lawn bowls and wheelchair fencing. Using the Adapted Research Council (MRC) measurements, muscle strength is tested using the bench press for a variety of spinal cord related injuries with a muscle being assessed on a scale of 0 to 5. A 0 is for no muscle contraction. A 1 is for a flicker or trace of contraction in a muscle. A 2 is for active movement in a muscle with gravity eliminated. A 3 is for movement against gravity. A 4 is for active movement against gravity with some resistance. A 5 is for normal muscle movement.

During functional and medical classification, a number of tests may be run for people in this class. For the trunk rotation test, people in this class are expected to have abdominal function.

Wheelchair fencing classification has 6 test for functionality during classification, along with a bench test. Each test gives 0 to 3 points. A 0 is for no function. A 1 is for minimum movement. A 2 is for fair movement but weak execution. A 3 is for normal execution. The first test is an extension of the dorsal musculature. The second test is for lateral balance of the upper limbs. The third test measures trunk extension of the lumbar muscles. The fourth test measures lateral balance while holding a weapon. The fifth test measures the trunk movement in a position between that recorded in tests one and three, and tests two and four. The sixth test measures the trunk extension involving the lumbar and dorsal muscles while leaning forward at a 45 degree angle. In addition, a bench test is required to be performed.
