= VUT =

VUT may refer to:

- Vanuatu, an island nation in the South Pacific Ocean
  - Vanuatu Time, UTC+11:00
- Vaal University of Technology, Gauteng Province, South Africa
- Vysoké učení technické v Brně, the Brno University of Technology in Brno, Czech Republic
- Victoria University of Technology, former name of Victoria University, Australia
