= VN =

VN or Vn may refer to:

- Viet Nam (popular abbreviation and ISO 3166-1 alpha-2 country code VN)
  - .vn, the country code top-level domain (ccTLD) for Vietnam
  - Vietnam Airlines (IATA airline designator VN)
- Visual novel, a type of interactive fiction game
- Vestibular nuclei, collections of neurons in the brain of humans and primates
- Holden VN Commodore, an automobile introduced by Holden in 1988
- Kawasaki VN "Vulcan", motorcycle series
- Vanadium(III) nitride, an inorganic chemical compound
- Vanilla Ninja, a popular Estonian girl group
- Vault Network, a group of gaming websites and message boards
- Vrij Nederland, a Dutch magazine
