= VBA =

VBA may refer to:

== Computing ==
- Visual Basic for Applications, the application edition of Microsoft's Visual Basic programming language
- VisualBoyAdvance, an emulator for the Nintendo Game Boy Advance handheld video game system

== Organizations ==
- Vanchit Bahujan Aghadi, an Indian political party
- Veterans Benefits Administration, an organizational element of the U.S. Department of Veterans Affairs
- Veterans Benevolent Association, an early gay-interest organization founded by World War II veterans
- Vietnam Basketball Association, a professional men's basketball league in Vietnam
- Virginia Bar Association, a US voluntary organization of Virginia lawyers
- Vojnobezbednosna agencija, the Military Security Agency of Serbia
