= VFM =

VFM may refer to:

- Value for money, a term in economics
- Value for Money, a 1955 British film
- Vision Forum Ministries
- Voice for Men
