= VLA =

VLA or vla may refer to:

== Organizations ==
- Vermont Library Association, professional organization for librarians from Vermont
- Veterinary Laboratories Agency, a UK government agency for researching animal and public health
- Victoria Legal Aid, an Australian Government agency supplying legal assistance to financially disadvantaged persons in the state of Victoria
- Victorian Legislative Assembly, the lower house of the State Parliament of Victoria, Australia
- Virginia Library Association, professional organization for librarians from Virginia
- Volunteer Lawyers for the Arts, any of a number of organizations providing pro bono legal assistance to members of the arts community

== Science and technology ==
- Very Large Array, a radio telescope array in the US
- Variable-length array, a dynamically-sized data structure in several programming languages
- Vision-language-action model, foundation model used in robotics that combine vision, language and actions

== Other uses ==
- EASA CS-VLA, the European Aviation Safety Agency certification specification for Very Light Aircraft
- RUM-139 VL-ASROC (Vertical Launch ASROC), an anti-submarine weapon of the US Navy
- The VLA, a band, performers of the title sequence for the television series Damages
- Vla, a Dutch custard-like dairy product typically eaten for dessert
- Venga la alegría, a Mexican morning television show
