= Virtual field trip =

Online learning activity

Virtual field trips (VFTs) are learning opportunities for students to engage in virtual tours of real-life environments via internet platforms. Based on various media modalities: videos, 360-degree images/videos, live streaming, and immersive technology like virtual reality, VFTs provide an interactive alternative for traditional in-person field trips. The trips create available access to many locations that would otherwise be difficult to access because of geographic, economic, logistical, or chronological issues. VFTs have educational uses and benefits for all ages.

== Modalities ==
Virtual field trips can be offered to students in various ways, with different levels of interactivity, immersion, and accessibility. These levels can be selected based on learning goals, technology available, and level of student interaction desired.

=== Pre-recorded Video Trips ===
Pre-recorded video trips are the most widely used and most accessible type of virtual field trip. Students can watch the learning content whenever and however they like. Pre-recorded video trips are often located on online or educational websites. Pre-recorded video trips can help with understanding all sorts of content, if the trips are delivered in an organized manner. Students, however, often prefer more advanced technologies like, 360 imagery and immersive virtual reality. Nonetheless, even when resources or funding are lacking, 2D videos can also create lasting learning opportunities.

=== Live Streamed Field Trips ===
Live-streamed virtual field trips provide immediate interactions with guides, scientists, and educators who are usually streaming from onsite or remote environments. In live sessions, students were able to ask questions and get immediate feedback. This leads to a more interactive experience and a more engaging form of VFTs for students. Live streaming is less expensive than virtual reality field trips, but it can still be used to provide reasonable quality learning experiences.

=== 360 Degree and Virtual Reality (VR) Field Trips ===
360-degree and virtual reality (VR) field trips are a more immersive evolution of the standard virtual field trip models. The new experiences allow students to explore environments from a first-person perspective. The experiences are developed through panoramic 360-degree videos/images, which capture the real world in all directions. The viewer can look around freely, and it is best viewed on VR headsets. Such devices have been proven to increase engagement and motivation in students while also speeding up their learning process.

== Uses in Education ==
=== Elementary School ===
Virtual field trips (VFTs) in elementary school can be effective because they can be a way of sparking curiosity and getting young children to safely explore new environments. At this age, students respond positively to experiences with lots of engagement, which helps them increase their understanding of the world. The students can place themselves in a jungle, move around a space museum, or explore various cultural/historical sites located around the world. VFTs can be used to engage young learners in discussion amongst themselves and create memorable moments for students, which can help with student retention of literacy, science, and social studies concepts.

=== Middle School ===
VFTs in middle school can create a transition to deeper learning by having the students connect what they are studying in school to the various environments they can explore digitally. Students begin to think more critically in middle school, and virtual learning experiences can help them deepen their understanding of the world. Virtual field trips to historical events or cultural festivals around the world can help reinforce comprehension skills and provide noteworthy information for the students to deliberate on. VFTs can be used to represent real-life issues, such as the impact of climate change on Greenland's ecosystem. These trips allow for discussion and thinking between the students and relate it to their learning inside the classroom.

=== High School ===
At the High School, VFTs can provide students with additional opportunities for real-world problem solving and career exploration. Students in high school begin considering college or their options in the workforce. VFTs can assist this by providing students with virtual experiences that mirror real-world problems. Virtual trips to science labs, of dissections, or social study events allow students to learn about and engage with complex matters in a more hands-on way. VFTs can be used with project-based learning, where students would apply the knowledge and skills they learned in the VFTs to real-world research projects or presentations. VFTs can also introduce students to different possible career paths, such as a VFT that takes them into a physics lab. These VFT learning experiences can be especially beneficial for students from under-resourced schools where they might not always have the opportunities for traditional field trips or internships.

== Other ==
The non-interactive forms of VFT are an inter-related collection of images, supporting text and/or other media, delivered electronically via the World Wide Web, in a format that can be professionally presented to relate the essence of a visit to a time or place. The virtual experience becomes a unique part of the participants' life experience. (Nix, 1999)

Virtual field trips (VFTs) started appearing around 1995 (LEARNZ), but greatly grew in popularity starting around 2000. The VFT was seen as a way to organize the educational potential of the internet in a coherent, appropriate fashion, particularly for primary and secondary education. A VFT can contain a selection of topic-specific web pages that are strung together into a grade-targeted, organized package. Often these types of VFT are provided by commercial distributors, such as Tramline. www.tramline.com

There are a number of different formats used for VFTs and if you do a search on the Web, you will find thousands of trips. Some trips simply consist of a list of links on one web page, while other trips use some type of navigator (or buttons) to move through the tour. Following current pedagogy; in its best implementation, a VFT is a real time guided field trip that is supported by interactive pages on the Web that have been selected by educators and arranged in a "thread" that teachers and students can follow in either lineal or broad searching. The live links with experts on-site in real-time is a key aspect in creating a "real" experience for students. For example, with LEARNZ virtual field trips students have asked questions of scientists in Antarctica, mining staff underground and even electrical engineers on the top of wind turbines.

== References and External Links ==
- WikiFieldTrip
- Tramline
- LEARNZ Virtual Field Trips
- M.O.E. NZ link
- Center for Interactive Learning and Collaboration
