= VE =

VE or ve may refer to:

== Businesses and brands ==
- EUjet (2003-2005, IATA airline designator VE)
- Avensa (1943-2004, IATA airline designator VE)
- Valley Entertainment, a U.S. record label and music distributor
- Visalia Electric Railroad (reporting mark VE)
- Vision Eternel, a Canadian-American ambient rock band (abbreviated as VE in reviews and interviews)
- Volare Airlines (1997-2009, IATA airline designator VE)
- Holden Commodore (VE), a model of the Holden Commodore, a car produced by GM Australia
- Ve Global (also known as Ve)

== Language ==
- Ve (Cyrillic), name of the character В, в, from the Cyrillic alphabet
- Ve (Arabic letter), a character of the Arabic alphabet
- Vè, a Vietnamese poetic form
- Ve, a proposed gender-neutral pronoun
- ve, a contraction of the English auxiliary verb "have"
- Venda language (ISO 639 alpha-2 code "ve")

== Places ==
- Ve, Norway, a village in Kristiansand municipality, Vest-Agder county, Norway

== Science and technology ==
=== Biology and medicine ===
- Minute ventilation (V_{E}), of the lungs
- VE (nerve agent), by NATO designation, a chemical weapon agent
- Vaccine efficacy
- Viliuisk encephalomyelitis
- Viral eukaryogenesis
- Voluntary euthanasia

=== Computing ===
- .ve, the Internet TLD for Venezuela
- Virtual environment, a primary component of a Virtual Reality system
- Virtual Earth, former name of Microsoft's Bing Maps Platform
- VisualEditor, a MediaWiki editor developed for Wikipedia

=== Other uses in science and technology ===
- Value engineering, a method to improve the "value" of products and services by examination of function
- Vinyl ester resin, a resin
- Volcanic explosivity index
- Volumetric efficiency
- V_{E}, voltage relative to the ground ("Earth")
- Electron neutrino (ν_{e}), in physics

== Other uses ==
- VE, reincarnation of the seventh Seraphim
- Vili and Vé, gods in Norse mythology
- Vé (shrine), a shrine in Germanic paganism and modern place name element
- Venezuela (ISO, FIPS 10-4, and NATO (obsolete) country code VE)
- Victory in Europe Day, or V-E Day
- Viva Emptiness, a music album by Katatonia
- Vertical exaggeration, a vertical scaling used in technical diagrams
- Vocational expert, an authority in the areas of vocational rehabilitation
- Amateur radio callsign prefix for Canada, e.g. as in "VE1BOB", see Call signs in Canada
