= VCD (disambiguation) =

Video CD or VCD is a video medium with a lower digital resolution than DVD.

VCD may also refer to:

- VCD Athletic, football team
- Voice command device
- Value change dump, a dumpfile format
- Vocal cord dysfunction
- Vibrational circular dichroism
- Vinyl cyclohexene dioxide, also known as 4-vinylcyclohexene diepoxide
- Victoria River Downs Airport, IATA airport code "VCD"
- Verkehrsclub Deutschland, a German mobility association
