= VFA =

VFA may refer to:

- US Navy strike fighter squadron
- Victorian Football Association, an Australian rules football competition established in the 19th century
- Visiting Forces Agreement
- Volatile fatty acids
- Vaillancourt Folk Art, an American studio producing chalkware collectables.
- Veteran Feminists of America, an organization for veterans of the Second Wave of the feminist movement
- Veterans For America, an organization
- Victoria Falls Airport, Zimbabwe (IATA airport code: VFA)
- Valley Football Association, a high school football conference in Wisconsin
- Venture for America, a non profit fellowship focused on entrepreneurship
- Verband Forschender Arzneimittelhersteller - trade association of the German pharmaceutical industry
