= VFD =

VFD may refer to:

== Government ==
- Veterinary Feed Directive, United States
- Volunteer fire department

== Technology ==
- Vacuum fluorescent display
- Variable-frequency drive, on electric motors
- Virtual Floppy Disk (file type), in Microsoft Virtual PC

== Other uses ==
- V.F.D., a recurring acronym in A Series of Unfortunate Events
- Factory Workers' Union of Germany (Verband der Fabrikarbeiter Deutschlands; 1890–1933)

== See also ==
- Vicarius Filii Dei
- V. F. D. Pareto
