= VCT =

VCT may refer to:

- Valorant Champions Tour, an esports tournament series for the video game Valorant
- Variable camshaft timing, an automobile variable valve timing technology developed by Ford
- Venture capital trust
- Postal code for Victoria, Gozo, Malta
- IATA and FAA LID codes for Victoria Regional Airport, Texas
- Vintage Card Traders, an online sports card trading group
- Vintage Carriages Trust, a site carrying a database of Railway Preservation information
- Vinyl composition tile, a finished flooring material
- Virginia Capital Trail
- Vogel conflict test
- Volts Center Tapped
- Voluntary counseling and testing, for HIV/AIDS
- Volvo Cars Torslanda, near Göteborg, Sweden
- ISO 3166-1 code for Saint Vincent and the Grenadines

== See also ==
- VCM-01, a Vietnamese cruise missile
- N-VCT, Nissan Valve Timing Control System
