= VTC =

VTC may refer to:

== Academia ==
- Vehicular Technology Conference
- Vermont Technical College, US
- Virginia Tech Carilion School of Medicine and Research Institute, US
- Vocational Training Council, Hong Kong

== Other ==
- Vacaville Transportation Center, California, a bus station
- Vertcoin, a cryptocurrency
- Vesicular-tubular cluster, an organelle in eukaryotic cells
- Veterans Transition Center, California, US
- Video teleconferencing, see videotelephony
- Vietnam Television Corporation
- Virginia Transformer Corporation
- Visual terminal chart, another name for terminal area chart (especially in Australia).
- Volunteer Training Corps (1914–1918), UK
