= VSO =

VSO may refer to:

- V_{SO}, an aircraft's stall speed in the landing configuration
- Valdosta Southern Railroad
- Vancouver Symphony Orchestra, a Canadian orchestra performing in Vancouver, British Columbia
- Variable Speed Oscillator; see Oscillation
- Verb–subject–object in linguistic typology
- Vermont Symphony Orchestra, a symphony orchestra based in, and supported in part by, the U.S. state of Vermont
- Victoria State Opera, Australian opera company, merged in 1996 with Opera Australia
- Vienna State Opera, an opera house – and opera company – with a history dating back to the mid-19th century
- Vienna Symphony Orchestra
- Violin-shaped object, a pejorative term for a low-quality violin
- Virginia Symphony Orchestra, an orchestra based in Norfolk, Virginia, founded in 1920
- Visual Studio Online, an early name for Azure DevOps (previously Visual Studio Team Services), a hosted application lifecycle management service from Microsoft
- Voluntary Service Overseas, an international development charity
- Volusia Sheriff's Office, law enforcement agency in Florida
- Volvo Super Olympian, double-decker bus
