= Forest Vegetation Simulator =

Forest growth and yield model developed by the U.S. Forest Service

The Forest Vegetation Simulator (FVS) is a forest growth and yield model developed by the United States Forest Service and is used by natural resource managers and researchers. FVS is calibrated for specific geographic areas and uses a host of simulation models to forecast forest composition and structure.

FVS uses current forest inventory data to describe initial stand conditions and requires a description of the inventory design, stand attributes, and a list of individual tree information. Extensions to FVS are available to assess the effects of forest insects and diseases, fire, and forest carbon.

== Model mechanics ==
FVS is an empirical forest growth model based on the Forest Inventory and Analysis (FIA) plots. It models individual tree growth as a function of average stand characteristics. Each of the regional variants is based on FIA plots within the region. The model is designed to produce reasonable approximations of forest growth which agree with the -3/2 thinning law and a basal area maximum.
