= Ven =

Ven or VEN may refer to:

== Places ==
- Ven, Heeze-Leende, a hamlet in the Netherlands
- Ven (Sweden), an island in Southern Sweden
- Ven, Tajikistan, a town in Tajikistan
- VEN or Venezuela

== Other uses ==
- von Economo neurons, also called spindle neurons
- Vên, an EP by Eluveitie
- Ven (currency), the virtual currency used in Hub Culture
- Venerable or Ven.
- Ven or Ventus, a character from Kingdom Hearts
- The ven, a fictional race of near-human beings Houses of the Blooded and other games by John Wick
- Ven, a purported raja of the Bathinda region
