= VZW =

VZW may refer to:

- Verizon (wireless service), an American wireless network operator
- Vereniging zonder winstoogmerk (VZW), a type of nonprofit organization in Belgium
