= VDOT =

VDOT may refer to:

- Virginia Department of Transportation, in the United States
- a running fitness measurement coined by Jack Daniels
