= VCDS (software) =

Diagnostic software for Volkswagen Group vehicles

- Original author: Uwe M. Ross
- Developers: Ross-Tech, LLC
- Release: May 16, 2000
- Stable release: 26.9 / August 28, 2026; 59 days ago
- Operating system: Windows
- Size: ~75 MB
- Available in: English, Czech, Danish, Dutch, French, German, Hungarian, Italian, Polish, Portuguese, Romanian, Spanish, Swedish
- Type: Automotive OBD
- License: Trialware
- Website: www.ross-tech.com/vag-com/

VCDS (an abbreviation for "VAG-COM Diagnostic System" and formerly known as VAG-COM) is a Microsoft Windows-based software package, developed and produced by Ross-Tech, LLC since May 2000. It is primarily used for diagnostics and adjustments of Volkswagen Group motor vehicles, including Volkswagen Passenger Cars, Audi, Bentley (limited), Lamborghini (limited), SEAT, and Škoda automobiles, along with Volkswagen Commercial Vehicles.

VCDS will perform most of the functions of the expensive electronic diagnostic tools available only to official dealers, like the current VAS 505x series diagnostic tools. In the past, these dealership-only tools have prevented owners, and many small independent repair shops from performing some fundamental tasks, such as diagnosing problems, diesel ignition timing, modification of convenience options such as automatic door unlocking, coding a replacement electronic control unit (ECU) or key to the vehicle, and monitoring of many vehicle sensors for diagnosing problems. Unlike generic on-board diagnostics (OBD-II or EOBD), VCDS uses the more in-depth Volkswagen Group-specific manufacturer protocol commands, which allows the user to access all diagnostic capable vehicle systems — even in vehicles which are not covered by generic OBD-II/EOBD (e.g. pre-1996). In general, there are two ways to use this software, either as a package (software and hardware) distributed by the manufacturer or their agents, or, by building your own interface hardware and using it with the publicly available but limited shareware version of the software.

VCDS is also capable of interfacing vehicles which use the generic OBD-II/EOBD protocols. However, the OBD-II and EOBD standards only allow for limited diagnostics, and no adjustments to any of the ECUs.
