= Fokker F.V =

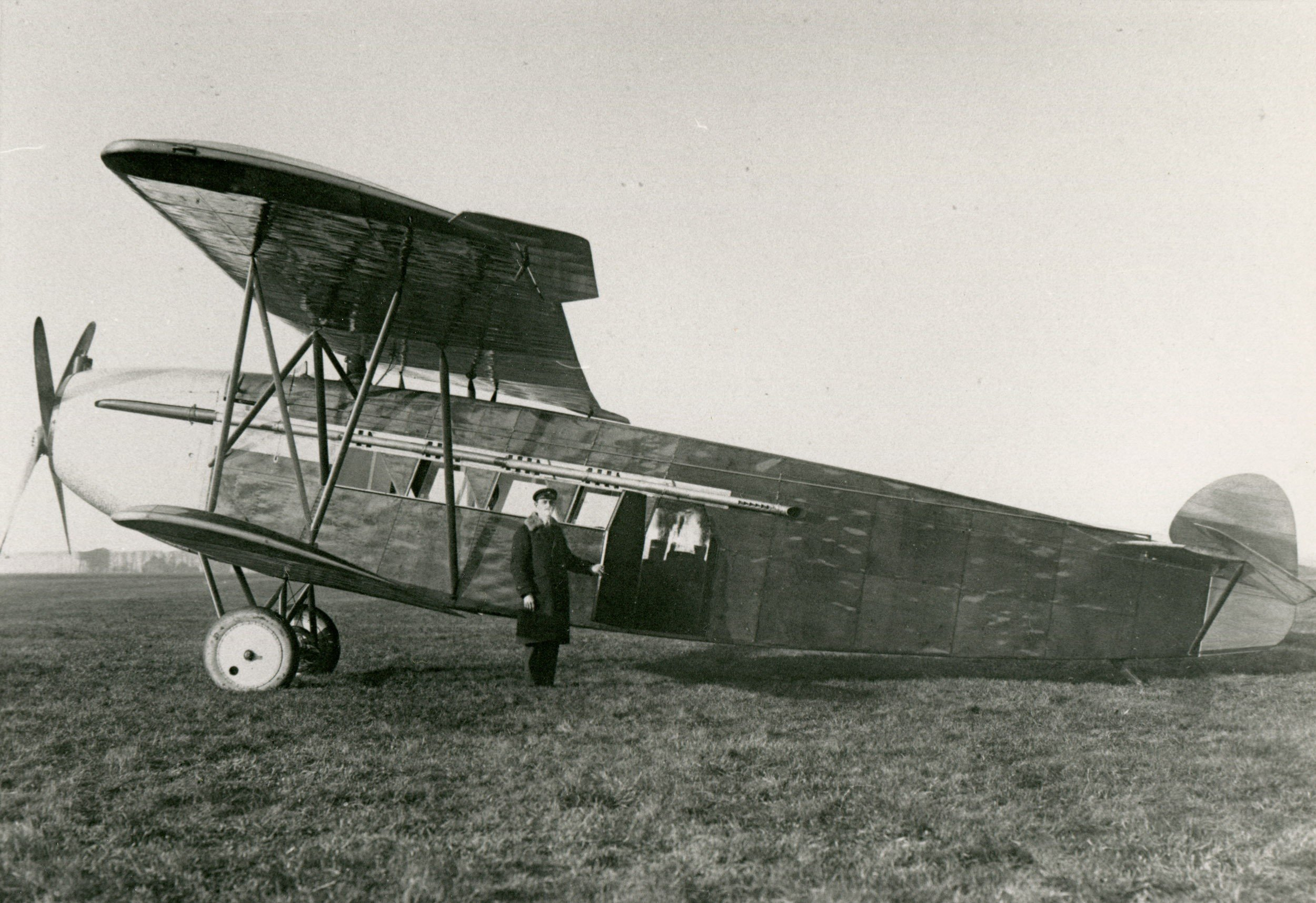

General information
- Type: Airliner
- Manufacturer: Fokker
- Designer: Reinhold Platz
- Number built: 1

History
- First flight: 7 December 1922

The Fokker F.V was a Dutch airliner created by Fokker in the 1920s. The most interesting property of the F.V was that it could be configured either as a biplane or a monoplane, as the lower wing could be removed. It was not a success and only one was built.

== Design and development ==
There are no surviving records of the early thinking of Anthony Fokker that lead to this unusual aircraft, designed by Reinhold Platz. The idea was that the biplane configuration would be able to lift greater loads because of the greater wing area, whereas the monoplane version would suffer lower drag and be faster. The upper wing was a typical Fokker thick, internally braced design, with ailerons projecting beyond the wingtips, all in the style of the earlier F.III and F.IV aircraft. However, with the F.V it was mounted as a parasol wing, connected to the fuselage by four struts on each side. The biplane conversion was designed to be simple, with the lower wing connected to the upper by simple N type struts, uncomplicated by bracing wires.

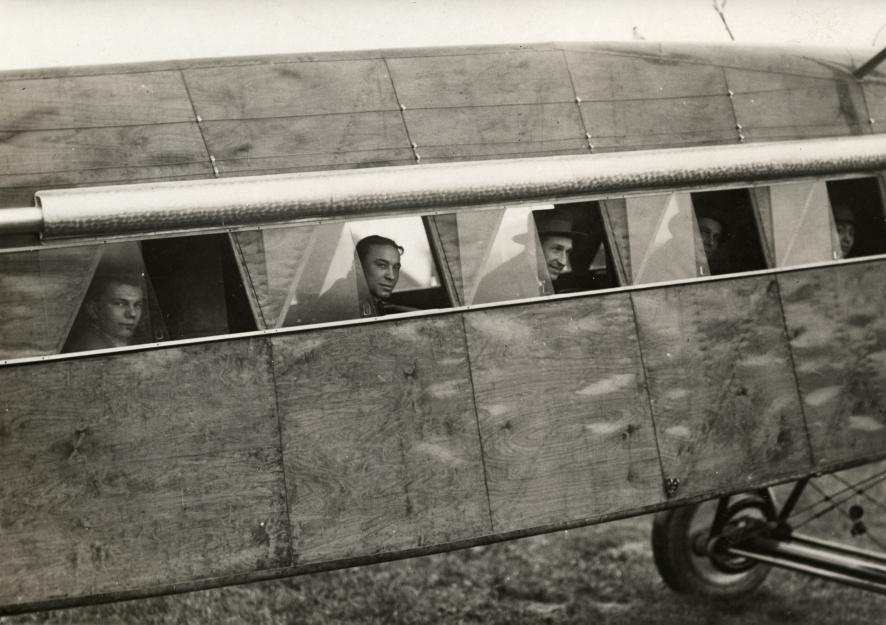
Plywood fuselage cover on the F.V

Fokker's earlier machines had fabric covered tube steel fuselages, but in the F.V the fabric was replaced by an inner and an outer layer of plywood (both triple-ply) to increase stiffness. The fuselage was flat and deep sided, contributing to yaw stability and in its earliest form no vertical stabiliser was provided, only a rudder. Later the rudder was revised and a fin added.

The engine was a 268 kW (360 hp) Rolls-Royce Eagle water cooled in-line. This drove what was effectively a four-bladed propeller, though it was made by mounting two two-bladed propellers at right angles one behind the other on the single drive shaft. The increased number of blades meant that the diameter, thus tip velocity and noise was less than with a larger two-blade propeller.

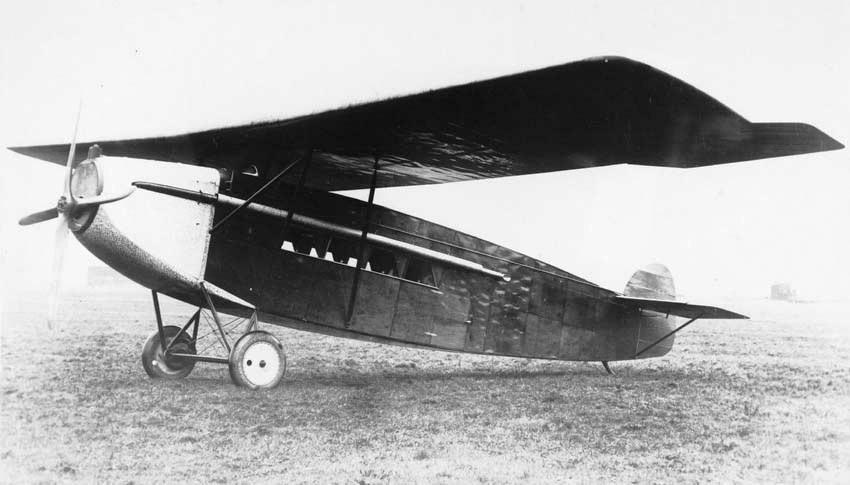
Fokker F.V as a monoplane (lower wing removed)

The design reflected the realisation that airliners were going to fly further and longer: it had dual controls, toilet and wash facilities and cabin heating. The later was provided by running the engine exhaust pipes horizontally along the aircraft sides above all the cabin windows, where vents allowed the warm air heated by the outside of the exhaust to flow inboard. Seating for eight passengers was provided.

The first flight took place on 7 December 1922 from Schiphol. One characteristic emerged immediately: the plywood panelling of the fuselage made the aircraft vibrate and the cabin extremely noisy. During trials the F.V reportedly flew mostly as a biplane. The sole F.V left the Dutch aircraft register in May 1926, marked "Sold to Austria".

== Specifications ==
General characteristics

- Crew: 2
- Capacity: 8 passengers
- Length: 12 m (39 ft 4 in)
- Wingspan: 16 m (52 ft 6 in)
- Height: 4 m (13 ft 1 in)
- Empty weight: 1,900 kg (4,189 lb)
- Max takeoff weight: 3,100 kg (6,834 lb)
- Powerplant: 1 × Rolls Royce Eagle V-12 water-cooled piston engine, 268 kW (359 hp)

Performance

- Cruise speed: 180 km/h (110 mph, 97 kn)
