= Voice-operated switch =

Switch controlled by the sound of speech

In telecommunications, a voice operated switch, also known as VOX or voice-operated exchange, is a switch that operates when sound over a certain threshold is detected. It is usually used to turn on a transmitter or recorder when someone speaks and turn it off when they stop speaking. It is used instead of a push-to-talk button on transmitters or to save storage space on recording devices. On cell phones, it is used to save battery life. Intercom systems that use a speaker in a room as both a speaker and a microphone will often use VOX on the main console to switch the audio direction during a conversation. The circuit usually includes a delay between the sound stopping and switching direction, to avoid the circuit turning off during short pauses in speech.

A special case exists, if there is enough energy to power the system directly. For example, a microphone may send a voltage high enough to directly operate a transmitter.

== Comparison with push-to-talk ==
Unlike manual push-to-talk (PTT) operation, VOX is automatic; the user can keep their hands free while talking. But VOX also has some significant disadvantages that explain why PTT is still common.

Most VOX circuits have a sensitivity adjustment, but unwanted (and sometimes undetected) VOX triggering can still occur on background noise, heavy breathing or a side conversation. Conversely, it may not activate when desired on speech that is too weak.

The VOX in a two-way radio can also be triggered by the loudspeaker carrying the other side of the conversation. This problem can be minimized with an "anti vox" feature to decrease VOX sensitivity when the receiver is active.

Transmitters and recorders have short but finite activation times that may clip the beginnings of phrases. Some modern VOX circuits eliminate this problem by recording or transmitting a delayed version of the input signal. An older way of overcoming this, used by pilots, and astronauts, as some of the first users of VOX, was to habitually preface every transmission with "uh" in place of keying the microphone.

VOX uses a "hang" timer, typically 1–3 seconds, to remain engaged during brief speech pauses. This means the last several seconds of each transmission or recorded segment are always silence. A VOX-activated recorder can delete the end of each segment but the user of a VOX-activated half duplex radio must wait for the timer to expire before he or she can receive again.

== See also ==
- Voice activity detection
- Noise gate
