= Vi =

vi most commonly refers to:

- vi (text editor), a screen-oriented text editor software application

VI, Vi, vi, V.I., or v.i. may also refer to:

== Arts, entertainment, and media ==
=== Characters ===
- Vi (League of Legends), from the League of Legends video game franchise
- Vi (Buffy the Vampire Slayer), a minor character in the American TV series Buffy the Vampire Slayer
- Violet Parr, in the Walt Disney Pictures animated film The Incredibles
- Vi Praskins, a major character in the 1950s American TV series Private Secretary

=== Music ===
- Submediant chord, symbolized "VI" or "vi"
- VI (Circle Jerks album), 1987
- VI (The Danse Society album), 2015
- VI (Onslaught album), 2013
- VI (You Me at Six album), 2018
- Ice-T VI: Return of the Real, an album by Ice-T, 1996
- VI Music, a Puerto Rican record label

=== Magazines ===
- Voetbal International, a prominent Dutch football (soccer) magazine
- Vi (magazine), a Swedish lifestyle magazine

== Businesses and organizations ==
- Vodafone Idea, branded as "Vi", a telecom operator based in India
- Vi Senior Living, a provider of retirement communities in the US
- Victoria Institution, a secondary school in Kuala Lumpur, Malaysia
- Volga-Dnepr (IATA airline code VI), an airline based in Ulyanovsk, Russia

== People ==
=== Name ===
- Violet (given name), sometimes shortened to Vi

=== In arts and media ===
==== In music ====
- Vi Burnside (1915–1964), American jazz musician
- Vi Redd (1928–2022), American jazz musician, vocalist and educator
- Vi Subversa (1935–2016), British musician
- Seungri or V.I. (born 1990), member of South Korean pop band Big Bang

==== In other arts ====
- Vi Anand, Indian film director and screenwriter
- Vi Gale (1917–2007), Swedish-born American poet and publisher
- Vi Hart (born 1988), "recreational mathemusician" known for creating mathematical YouTube videos
- Vi Huyền Đắc (1899–1976), Vietnamese playwright
- Vi Kaley (1878–1967), British actress
- Vi Keeland, American writer
- Vi Khi Nao, Vietnamese writer

=== In politics ===
- Vi Daley (born 1943), American politician
- Vi Jordan (1913–1982), Australian politician, second woman elected to the Queensland Legislative Assembly
- Vi June (1932–2020), American politician
- Vi Lloyd (1923–2013), Australian politician
- Vi Lyles (born 1952), American politician
- Vi Simpson (born 1946), American politician
- Victoria Imperatrix (Latin for: "Victoria the Empress"), referring to Queen Victoria

=== In sport ===
- Vi Farrell (1913–1989), English-born New Zealand cricketer
- Vi Jones (born 1998), American football player

=== In other fields ===
- Vi Hilbert (1918–2008), Native American tribal elder

== Places ==
- Vi, Sweden
- Vi, a village in Shkodër County, Albania
- Victoria Island, Lagos, an area of Lagos, Nigeria
- British Virgin Islands, by FIPS country code
- United States Virgin Islands, in many code systems including US postal code

== Science and technology ==
- vi (text editor), a screen-oriented text editor software application
- .vi, the country code top-level domain (ccTLD) for the US Virgin Islands
- Vapor intrusion, a process by which chemicals in soil or groundwater migrate to indoor air above a contaminated site
- Virginium, a rejected proposed name (abbreviated Vi) for the element francium
- Vinyl group, a chemical group with the formula H-C=CH2
- Virtual instrument or software synthesizer, a computer program or plug-in that generates digital audio
- Virtual instrumentation, customized software measurement systems that implement functions of an instrument by computer, sensors and actuators
- Viscosity index, a measure of how viscosity of a liquid changes with temperature
- Vulnerability index, a measure of the exposure of a population to some hazard
- Vi, an artificial intelligence personal trainer developed by LifeBEAM

== Other uses ==
- VI, 6 in Roman numerals
- vide infra, Latin for "see below"
- Visual impairment
- Vietnamese language, by ISO 639-1 code

== See also ==
- V1 (disambiguation) (number "1" as opposed to letter "i")
