= VF =

Vf or VF may stand for:

== Arts and entertainment ==
- Virtua Fighter, a series of fighting games by Sega
- Variable fighter, in the Macross manga series

== Businesses and organizations ==
- AJet, a Turkish airline, IATA code VF
- VF Corporation, a clothing company
- Valuair, an airline based in Singapore existed between 2004 and 2014, IATA code VF
- Vodafone Group, a telecommunications group based in the UK
  - Vodafone UK, its UK consumer subsidiary
- Vaterländische Front, a former Austrian political party
- Värmlands Folkblad, a Swedish-language daily newspaper
- VinFast, an automobile manufacturer from Vietnam

== Science, technology, and mathematics ==
=== Biology and medicine ===
- Ventricular fibrillation, a cardiac arrhythmia
- Visual field
- Vocal fold

=== Other uses in science, technology, and mathematics ===
- Forward Voltage of a diode
- Vector field, in mathematics
- Final velocity (v_{f}) in physics
- Voice Frequency (300–3000 Hz)
- a radio call sign format used in Canada to denote low-power broadcast transmitters, usually but not always exempt from conventional broadcast licensing
- Vinyl fluoride, monomer precursor to polyvinyl fluoride

== Automobiles ==
- Honda City VF, model code for the first generation van
- Holden Commodore VF, the fourth generation of the Commodore sedan produced by Holden

== Other uses ==
- Squadron (aviation), in military aviation
- VF-18, Fighting Squadron, United States Navy acronym
- Vicar Forane, or Dean (Christianity)
- Video floppy, an analog floppy diskette format to store still images
