= VB =

VB often refers to volleyball, a team sport.

VB, Vb, and variants may refer to:

== Places ==
- Province of Verbano-Cusio-Ossola (ISO code VB), Italy
- Vero Beach, a city in Florida, USA
- Virginia Beach, a city in Virginia, USA

== Companies and organizations ==
- VB, stock symbol for the Vanguard Small-Cap Index Fund
- VB Pictures, Indian film production company
- VB Rocks, fashion line designed by Victoria Beckham for Rock and Republic
- Veřejná bezpečnost, a Communist-era Czechoslovak police force
- Verkehrsbetriebe Biel, public transport operator in Biel/Bienne, Switzerland
- Villeroy & Boch, producer of ceramics from Germany
- VivaAerobús (IATA code VB), Mexican airline
- Vlaams Belang, Belgian political party
- Vlaams Blok, former Belgian political party
- Volksbank, bank in Vienna, Austria
- Vojvođanska banka a.d., active bank in Serbia
- Vojvođanska banka, defunct bank in Serbia

== Science and technology ==
- V_{B} speed, aircraft design speed for maximum gust intensity
- Valence band of the electrons in a (semiconducting) solid
- Valence bond theory, a theory that uses quantum methods to explain chemical bonding
- Van Biesbroeck's star catalog (VB)
- Visual Basic (classic), a legacy computer programming language from Microsoft
- Visual Basic .NET, a modern object-oriented programming language from Microsoft for .NET
- VirtualBox, an x86-virtualization package from Sun Microsystems
- Vitamin B, a kind of vitamin
- vBulletin, a forum software
- Group 5 element in the periodic table according to CAS group numbering
- Group 15 element in the periodic table according to old group numbering

== Sport ==
- Vágs Bóltfelag, a Faroese football club
- VB Sports Club, a Maldivian football club
- Vejle Boldklub, a Danish football club
- Valtteri Bottas, a Finnish motorsport driver

== Other uses ==
- Holden VB Commodore, a car produced by the former Australian subsidiary of General Motors, Holden
- Vande Bharat Express
- Vickers-Berthier, a light machine gun manufactured by Vickers-Armstrong
- Virtual Boy, a video game system by Nintendo
- Victoria Bitter, a beer produced in Victoria, Australia
- .vb, Sony PlayStation Wave Bank Body, a type of audio file readable by said console
