= Visicom Media =

Canadian software company

Visicom Media Network (VMN)
- Founded: Brossard, Quebec (1996)
- Founder: Patrice Carrénard, Dominique Tremblay and Nicolas Xanthopoulos
- Headquarters: Brossard, Quebec
- Area served: Worldwide
- Key people: Patrice Carrénard, President, Nicolas Xanthopoulos, CTO
- Products: Toolbars, Internet solutions
- Website: vmn.net

Visicom Media is a Canadian software company. They are known for developing tools, platforms and software products for large publishers and partners such as Yahoo!, Comcast, Verizon, Time Warner and Panda Security.

Visicom Media was founded in 1996 by Patrice Carrénard, Dominique Tremblay and Nicolas Xanthopoulos.
