= Very special relativity =

Topic in special relativity

Ignoring gravity, experimental bounds seem to suggest that special relativity with its Lorentz symmetry and Poincaré symmetry describes spacetime. Surprisingly, Bogoslovsky and independently Cohen and Glashow have demonstrated that a small subgroup of the Lorentz group is sufficient to explain all the current bounds.

The minimal subgroup in question can be described as follows: The stabilizer of a null vector is the special Euclidean group SE(2), which contains T(2) as the subgroup of parabolic transformations. This T(2), when extended to include either parity or time reversal (i.e. subgroups of the orthochronous and time-reversal respectively), is sufficient to give us all the standard predictions. Their new symmetry is called very special relativity (VSR).

== See also ==
- Lorentz violation
