= VT =

VT or Vt may refer to:

== Businesses and organizations ==
- Verlag Technik, a former German publishing house
- VT F.C. (Vospers Thornycroft FC), a UK football club
- VT Group, a British defence company
- Air Tahiti (IATA airline designator VT), a French airline
- Valley Transit (Washington), the public transit service of Walla Walla, Washington
- Valley Transit (Wisconsin), the public transit service of Wisconsin's Fox Cities
- The Vanguard Group, investment company in Pennsylvania
  - Vanguard Total World Stock
- Versement transport, a French local corporation tax
- National Rail code for UK train operator Virgin Trains West Coast and its successor Avanti West Coast
- Virginia and Truckee Railroad, a short line railroad in Nevada
- Virginia Tech, common name of the Virginia Polytechnic Institute and State University, Blacksburg, Virginia
- VolgaTelecom, Russian telecommunications company
- VT, a news and entertainment platform; see Jungle Creations

== Science and technology ==
=== Computing ===
- Ventrilo, a voice-chatting program for gamers
- Vertical tab, ASCII character 11
- Video terminal, a “computer terminal” with a video display
- Video Toaster, a video editing program
- Virtual terminal, an application service
- Intel VT, Intel Virtualization Technology
  - Intel VT-i, Intel Virtualization Technology for Itanium
  - Intel VT-c, Intel Virtualization Technology for Connectivity
  - Intel VT-d, Intel Virtualization Technology for Directed I/O
  - Intel VT-x, Intel Virtualization Technology for x86

=== Other uses in science and technology ===
- Vanishing twin, a fetus which dies in utero and is partially reabsorbed by its twin
- Ventricular tachycardia, an abnormal heart rhythm
- Holden Commodore (VT), an automobile
- Tau neutrino (ν_{τ}), in physics
- Variable timing fuze, a type of proximity fuze
- Videotape, a video recording medium
- Vinča-Turdaș culture, an archaeological culture in Europe
- Virtual training, a training method in which a simulated virtual environment is used
- Thermal voltage (V_{T}) of a semiconductor p-n junction
- Threshold voltage (V_{t}) of a MOSFET
- Voltage transformer, in electricity distribution
- Valdôtain tresse, one of the friction hitches used by tree surgeons and other climbers to ascend a rope

== Other uses ==
- Vanuatu vatu, a currency
- VeggieTales, a Christian-themed animated children's television show
- Vendange tardive, a French designation for late harvest wines
- Vermont, a U.S. state with postal abbreviation VT
- Vertical Tank, a vehicle in Capcom's Steel Battalion
- Vetus Testamentum, a religious journal
- Victoria Terminus, former name of the Chhatrapati Shivaji Terminus of the Mumbai suburban railway
- Virtualtourist, a tourism related website
- Visiting teaching, a program for members of the LDS Church
- India (aircraft registration prefix VT)
- Transitive verb, in some dictionaries
