= Demographic history of Montenegro =

The demographic history of Montenegro can be shown through census results and official documents which mention demographic composition.

== Medieval ==
Duklja, today's southern half of Montenegro, under Stefan Vojislav, was inhabited by Serbs.

Various documents listed that the inhabitants of Medieval Doclea or Zeta were Serbs, but also minor populations of Latins, Albanians and Vlachs. The language in usage was primarily the Old Slavonic, while in the early stages Latin also had importance and Greek to an extent among the high-class members of the society.

Between the 15th and 17th century, Montenegro had little history on paper. During these years, hundreds of families from Montenegro moved to Rascia which Serbs left to sought refuge in Habsburg Monarchy.

== 1614 ==
Mariano Bolizza of Kotor was a public servant of the Republic of Venice. The main objective of his 1614 report and description of the Sanjak of Shkodra was to provide information on the land routes which could best be utilized by local couriers conveying official correspondence from Venice to Constantinople and back, and to survey the military potential of the territory. He provided a very detailed overview of towns and villages in Montenegro and northern Albania in the early 17th century. The report concluded a religious Orthodox majority, while an Albanian minority was present in the Shkodra region.

== 18th century ==
The ethnic composition in the 18th century was clear among the Slavs;

- In a letter to Justinian Bert in 1756, Montenegrin chieftains said: "We are of the Orthodox Christian faith and law of the Eastern Church, of the honorable and glorious Slav-Serb kin".
- Jovan Stefanov Balevic, of the Bratonožić clan, who later became a major in the Russian army, wrote "A brief and objective description of the present state of Montenegro" in St. Petersburg in 1757, where it said: "All inhabitants of Montenegro are ethnically Slav-Serbs and confessionally Greek-Orthodox . As they are incompetent in some skills, because of their lack of school, they are naturally capable, especially with weapons."; "The number of Montenegrin warriors who live free on the peaks of Montenegro, called by Turks disobedient, does not exceed 5000."; "There are no artisans and schools in Montenegro except at the Cetinje monastery, within the archbishop's residence, where priests learn reading and writing in the Slav-Serb language, which is financed by the archbishop."; "Montenegrins count among themselves neighbouring Slav-Serbs of different provenience: Kuči, Bratonožići, Donji and Gornji Vasojevići, Piperi, Rovčani, Moračani, Bjelopavlići, who are Serbian Orthodox but Ottoman citizens. They, also, count Roman Catholics: Hoti, Kelmendi, Gruda, Tuzi, Skrivali, Huzi, Maltezi, Kastrati and others who outnumber Montenegrins."
- Metropolitan Sava called his people, the Montenegrins, by the "Serbian nation" (1766).
- In June 1789, Montenegrin Chieftains, wrote to Russian Empress Katarina II, in the name of the entire Serb Montenegrin community: "We Serbs Montenegrins hope that we shall not be left without help" and "If we could have organization and munition, we would liberate our glorious Serb lands entirely from the Barbarian yoke (Ottoman Empire), together with our armed Serb brothers who aim to attack this enemy from all sides."

== 19th century ==
- According to the census conducted in 1863 and 1864, the Principality of Montenegro had a total of 196.230 inhabitants, 99.889 male and 96.339 female.
- Bernard Schwartz estimated in 1882 that the Princedom of Montenegro had 160,000 inhabitants. Although, a more usual estimate is that it was around 230,000 inhabitants.
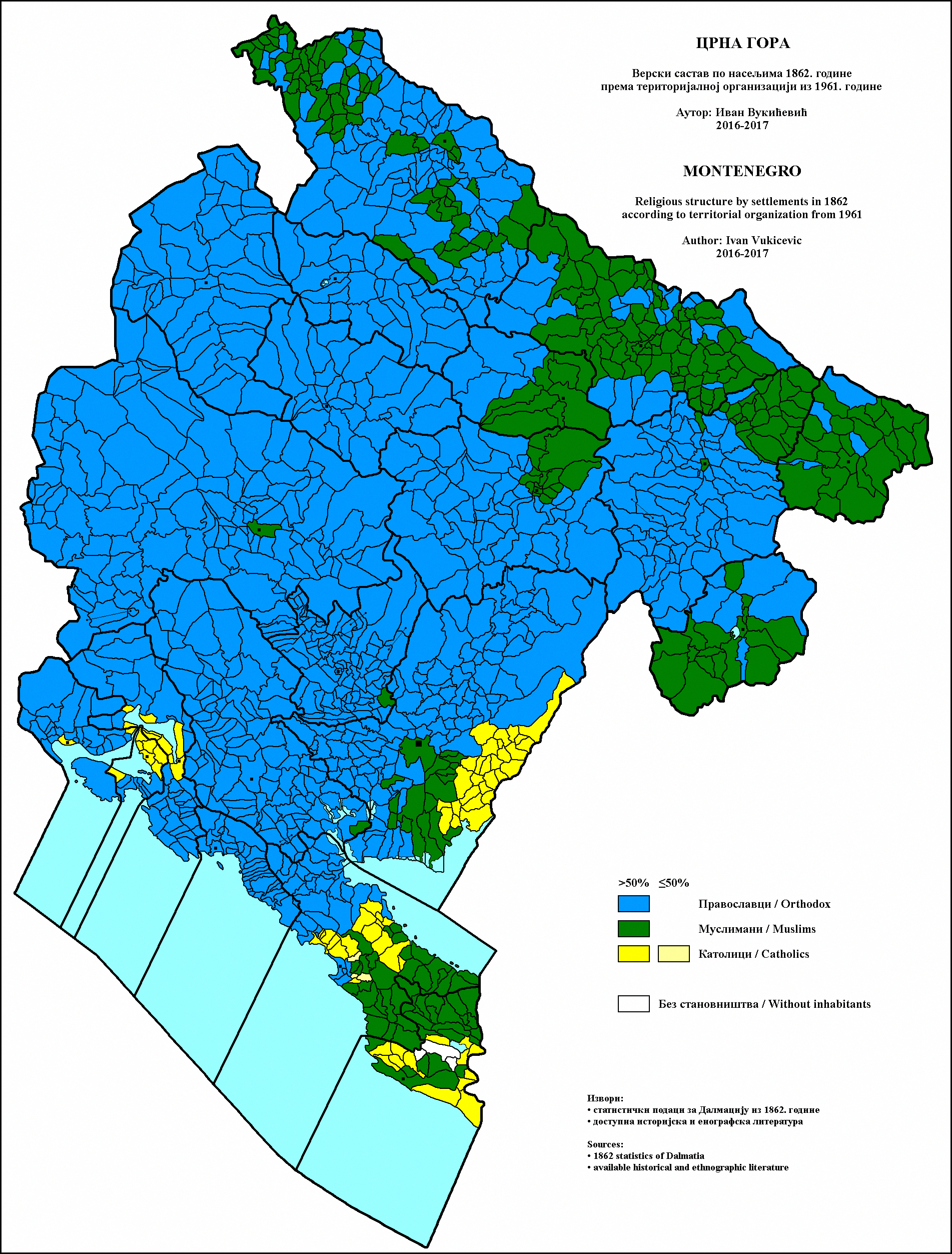
Religious structure of Montenegro by settlements 1862

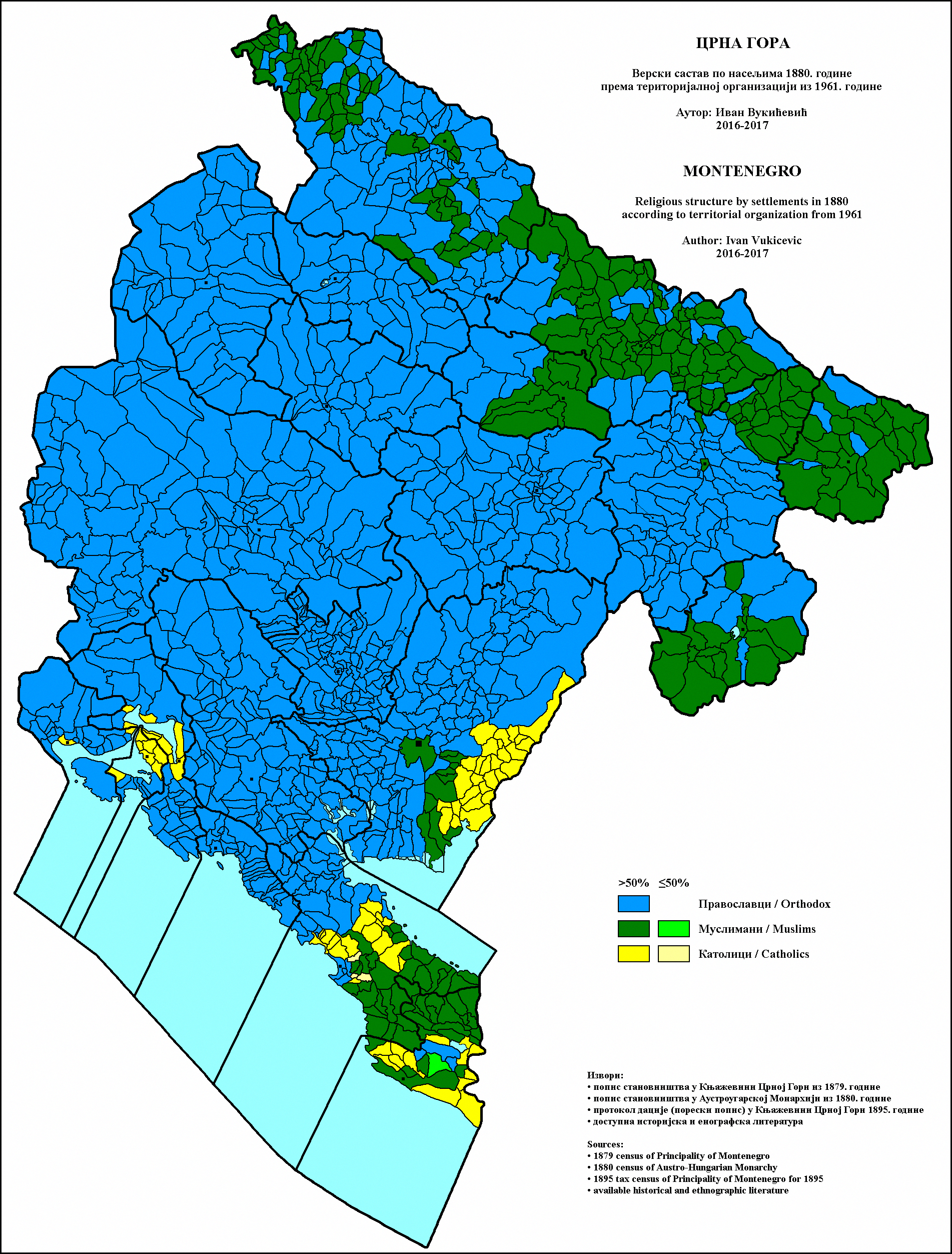
Religious structure of Montenegro by settlements 1880

== 1900 ==
In 1900, according to international sources, the Principality of Montenegro had 311,564 inhabitants. By religion:

- 293,527 Orthodox Christians (94.21%)
- 12,493 Muslims (4.01%)
- 5,544 Roman Catholic Christians (1.78%)

By literacy:

- 77% illiterate
- 71,528 (23%) literate

The Princedom had around 5,000 Albanians and a colony of 800 Romani.

== 1905–1909 ==
In 1905 there were 6,674 emigrants, mostly to the United States.

In 1906 there were 4,346 emigrants, mostly to the United States.

In 1907 it has been estimated that there were around 282,000 inhabitants in Montenegro this year.

== 1909 ==
The 1909 official census was made based on religious affiliation of population of Principality of Montenegro.

Total: 317,856 inhabitants. By religion:

- Eastern Orthodox Christians: 94.38%
- others (mostly Muslims)

== 1913–1914 ==
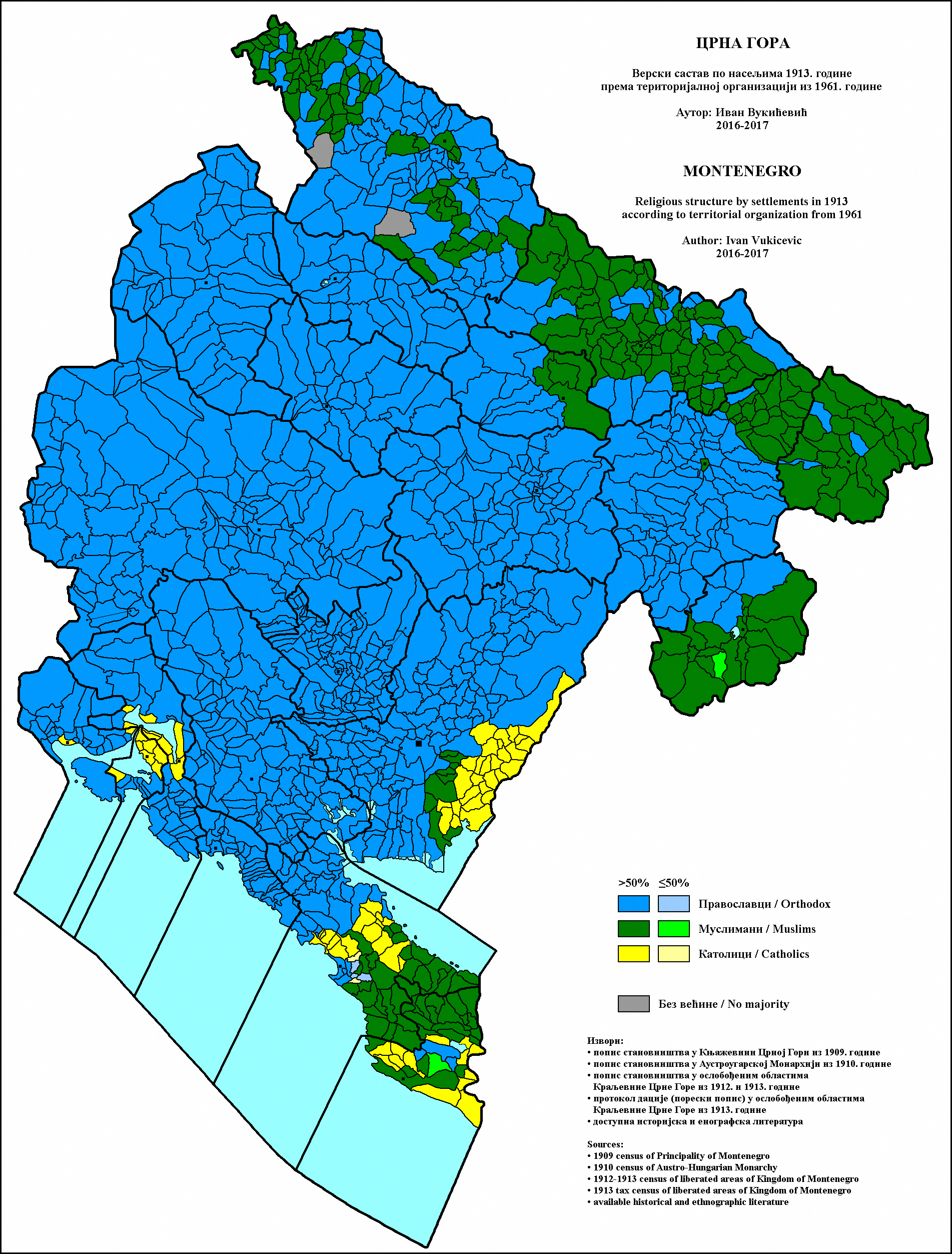
Religious structure of Montenegro by settlements 1913

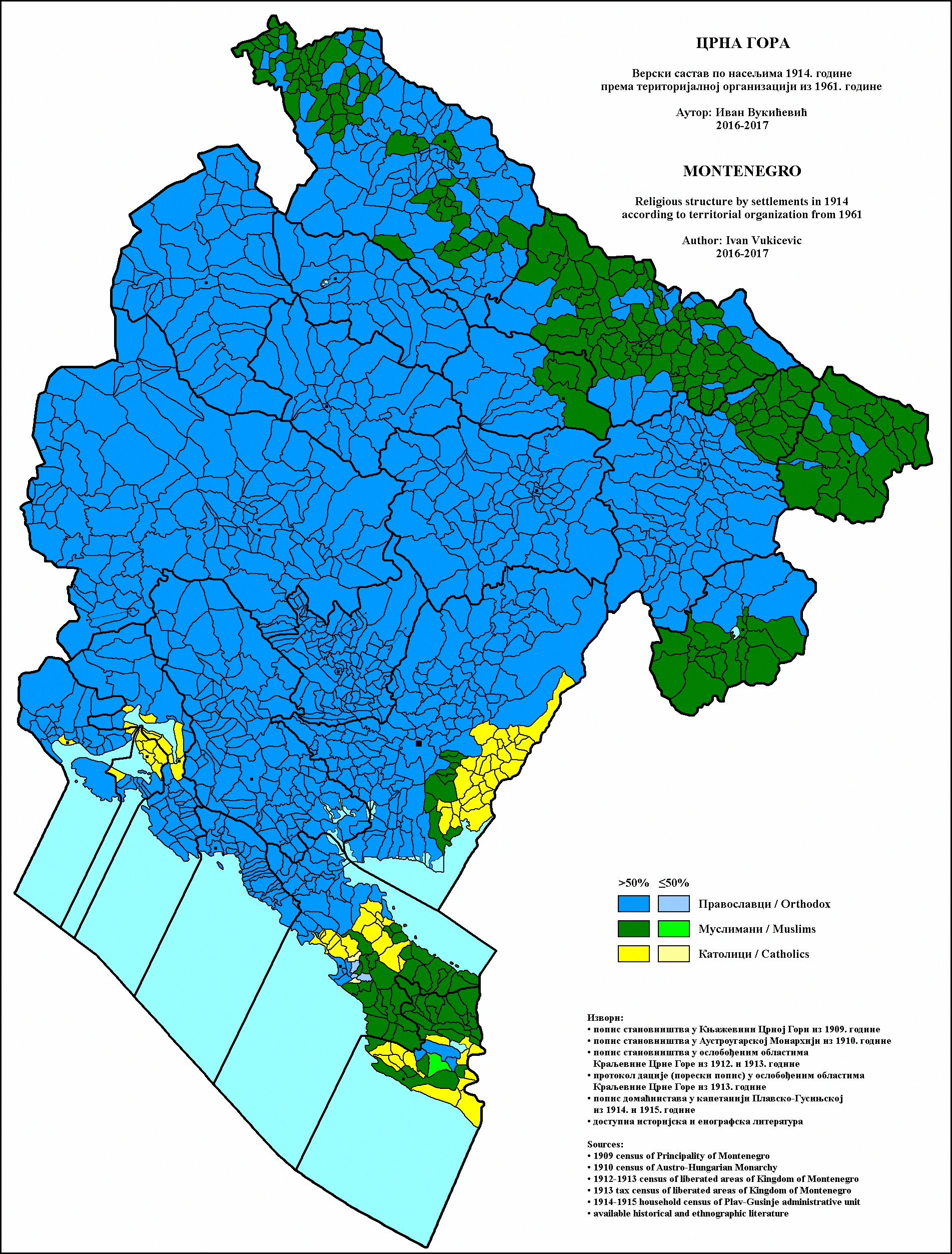
Religious structure of Montenegro by settlements 1914

== 1921 ==
In 1918 Montenegro entered the Kingdom of Serbs, Croats and Slovenes. In 1921 it organised a census which recorded the mother tongue and religion. A category called Serbian or Croatian was to include all respondents who termed their mother tongue as Serbian. In the counties Andrijevica, Bar, Kolasin, Niksic, Podgorica and Cetinje, which are categorized in official statistics as Montenegro, there were:

Total: 199,227 inhabitants

- Serbo-Croatian: 181,989 (91.35%)
- Albanian: 16,838 (8.45%)

The counties Berane and Bijelo Polje, which are today in Montenegro, were considered counties of Old Serbia:

- Berane, total 23,864 inhabitants, Serbs 23,561 or (98.73%)
- Bijelo Polje, total 26,147 inhabitants, Serbs 26,136 (99.96%)

== 1931 ==
The 1931 census was also taken by the Kingdom of Yugoslavia but was later processed in Communist Yugoslavia. Results within today's borders of Montenegro were:

Inhabitants of Montenegro
Eastern Orthodox	272,702 (75.74%)
Roman Catholics	26,070 (7.24%)
Islam	61,038 (16.95%)
Serbo-Croatian	339,955 (94.42%)
Albanian	18,098 (5.03%)
Total: 360,044 inhabitants

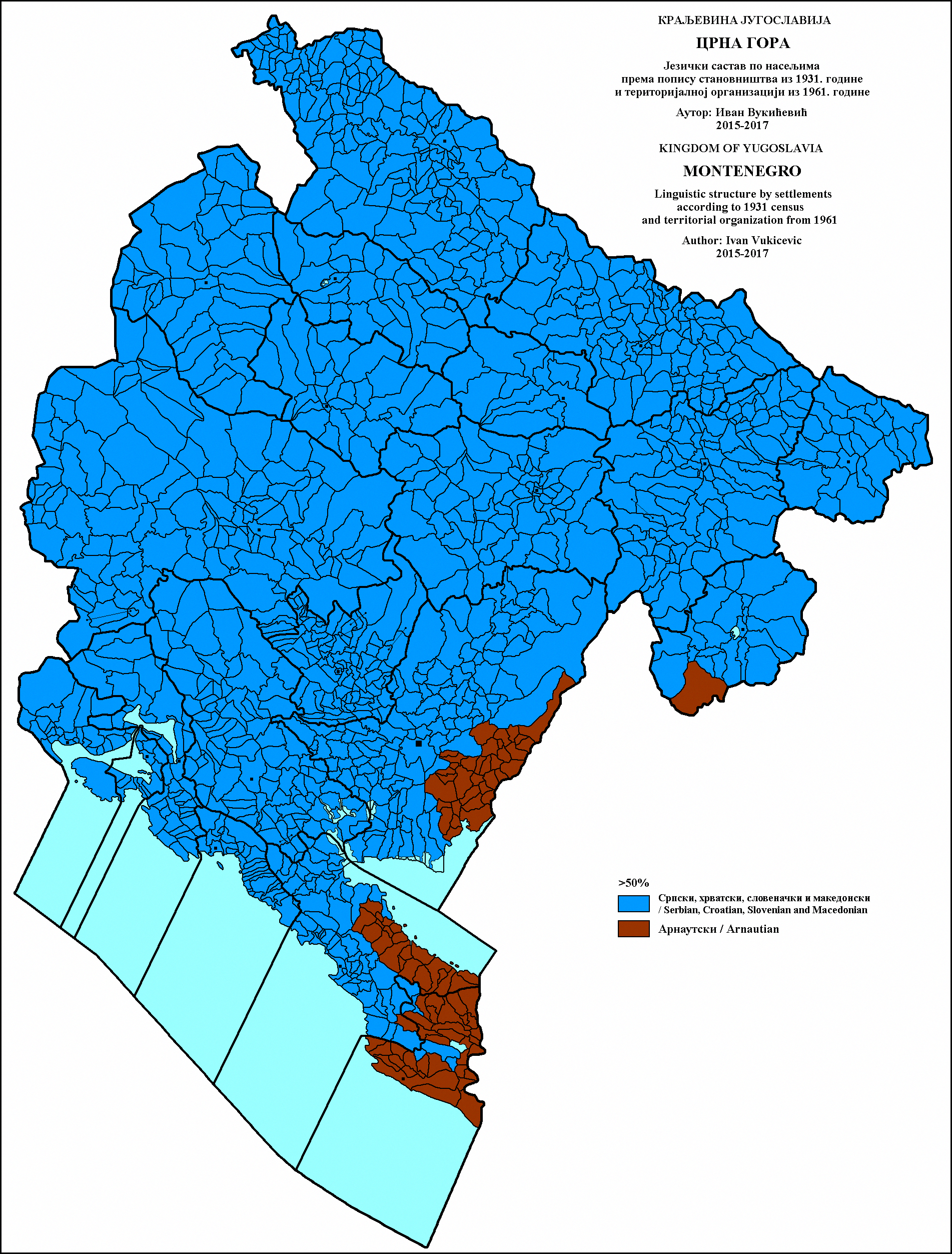
Linguistic structure of Montenegro by settlements 1931

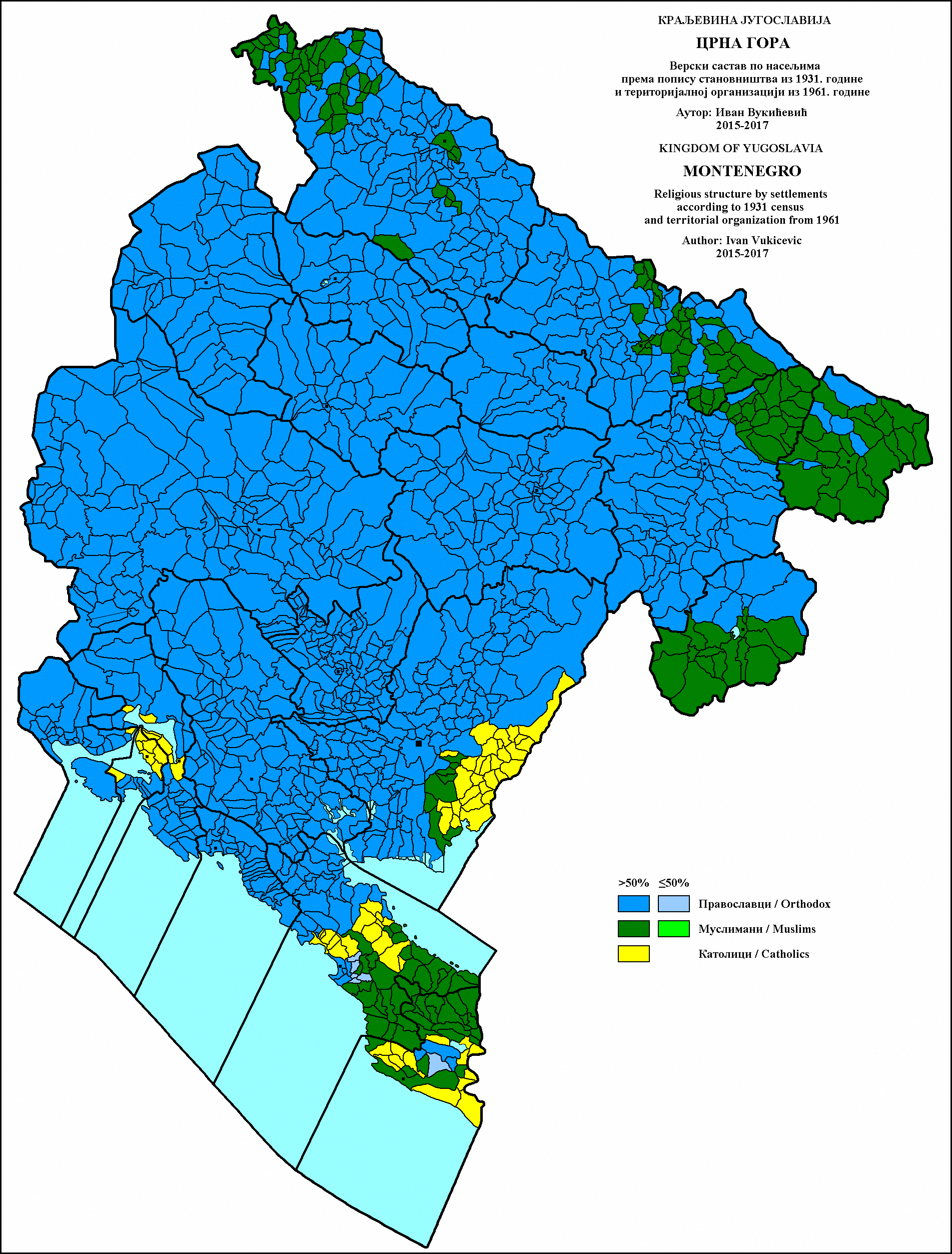
Religious structure of Montenegro by settlements 1931

== 1948 ==
In 1945, after the World War II, Communist Yugoslavia was formed, and Montenegro was proclaimed as one of its constituent republics. The 1948 and following censa were taken by the Republic of Montenegro.

Inhabitants of Montenegro, 1948 census
Montenegrins	342,009 (90.67%)
Albanians	19,425 (5.15%)
Croats	6,808 (1.8%)
Serbs	6,707 (1.78%)
Muslims	387 (0.1%)
Others	1860 (0.52%)
Total: 377,189 inhabitants. Group "Others" include Slovenes (484), Germans (375), Russians (277), Italians (162), Roma (162), Macedonians (133), Czechs (93) and Hungarians (62)

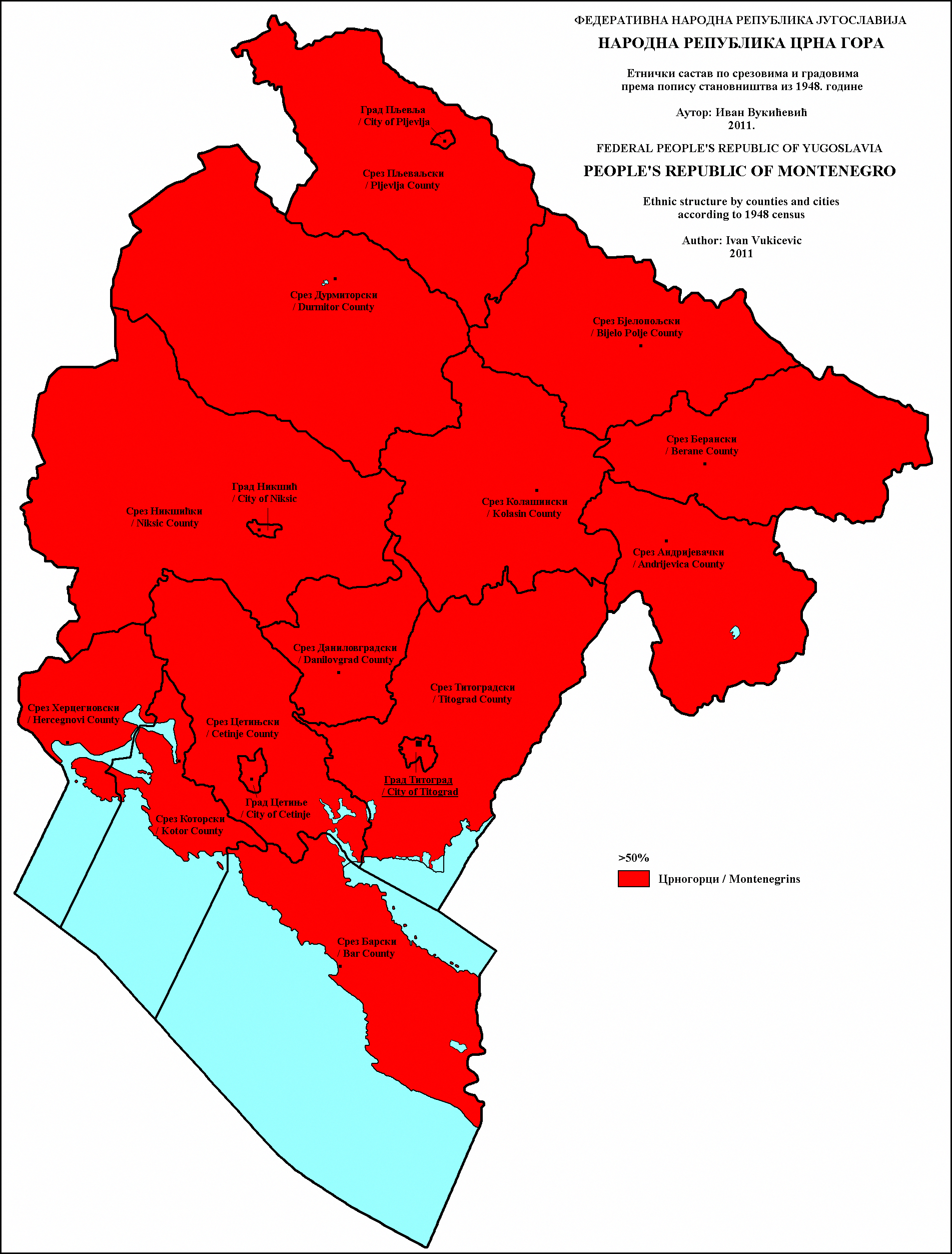
Ethnic structure of Montenegro by counties and cities 1948

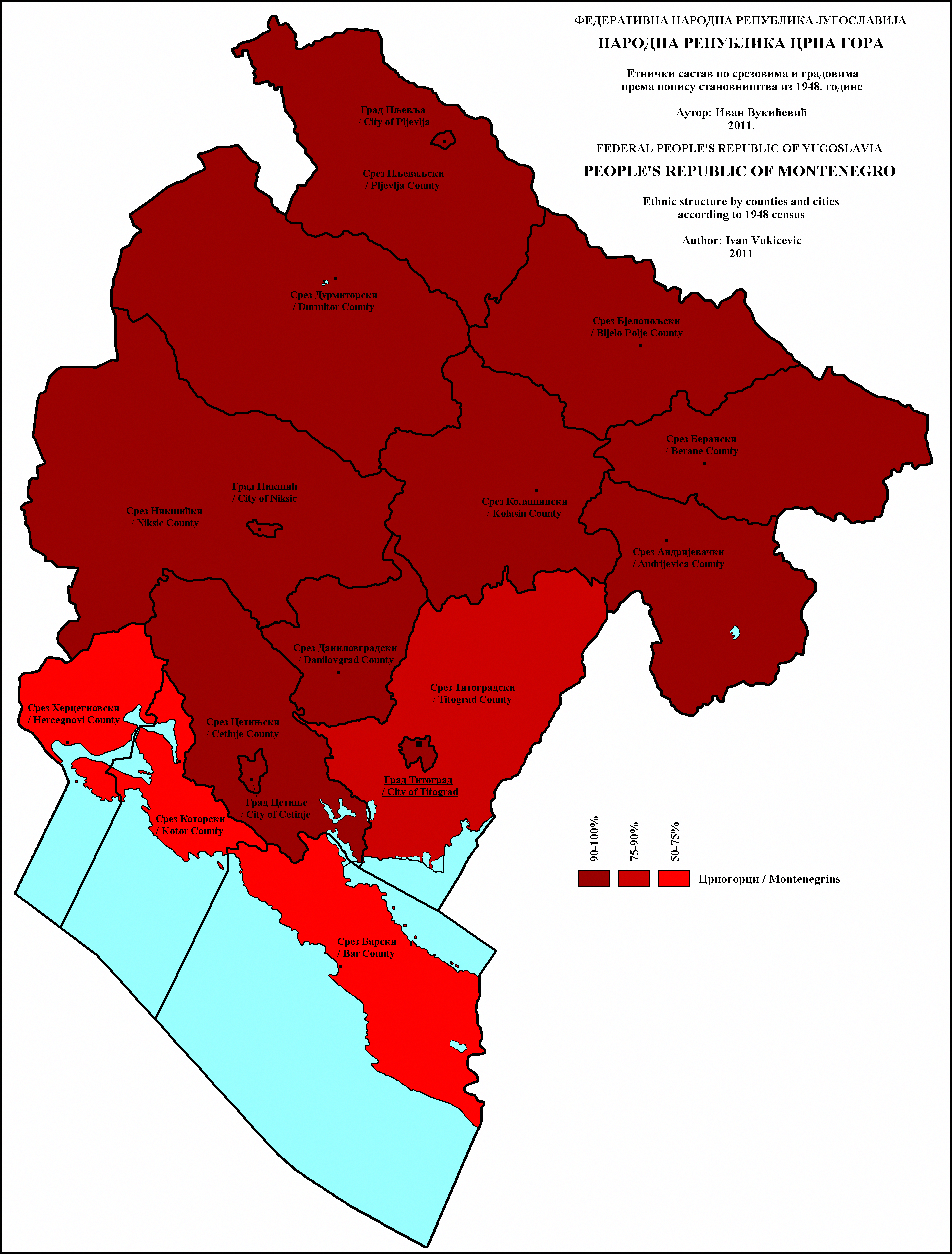
Ethnic structure of Montenegro by counties and cities 1948

== 1953 ==
Inhabitants of Montenegro, 1953 census
Montenegrins	363,686 (86.61%)
Albanians	23,460 (5.58%)
Serbs	13,864 (3.3%)
Croats	9,814 (2.33%)
Yugoslavs	6,424 (1.52%)
Others	2,625 (0.66%)
Total: 419,873 inhabitants

This census witnesses the forming of the Yugoslav nation.

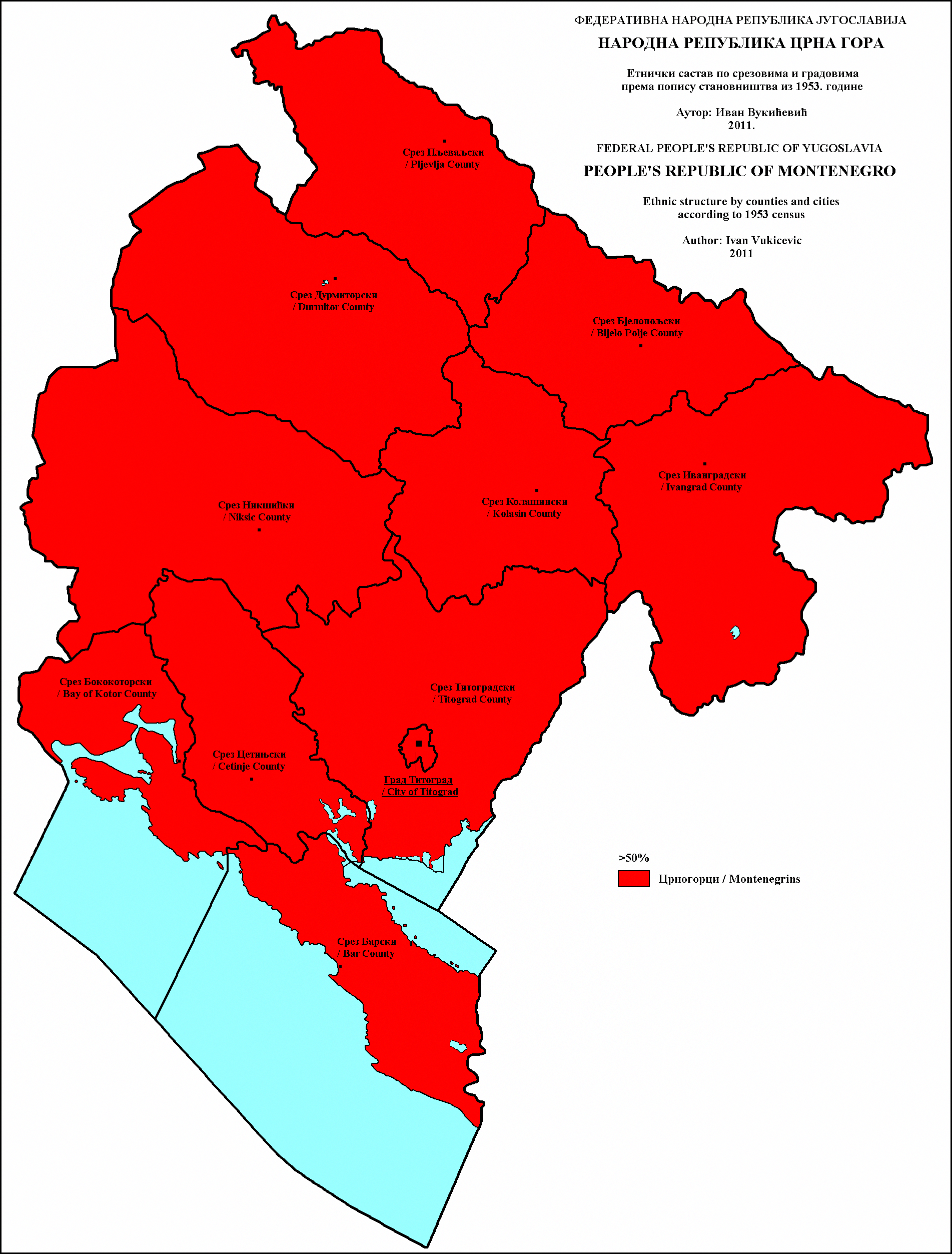
Ethnic structure of Montenegro by counties and cities 1953

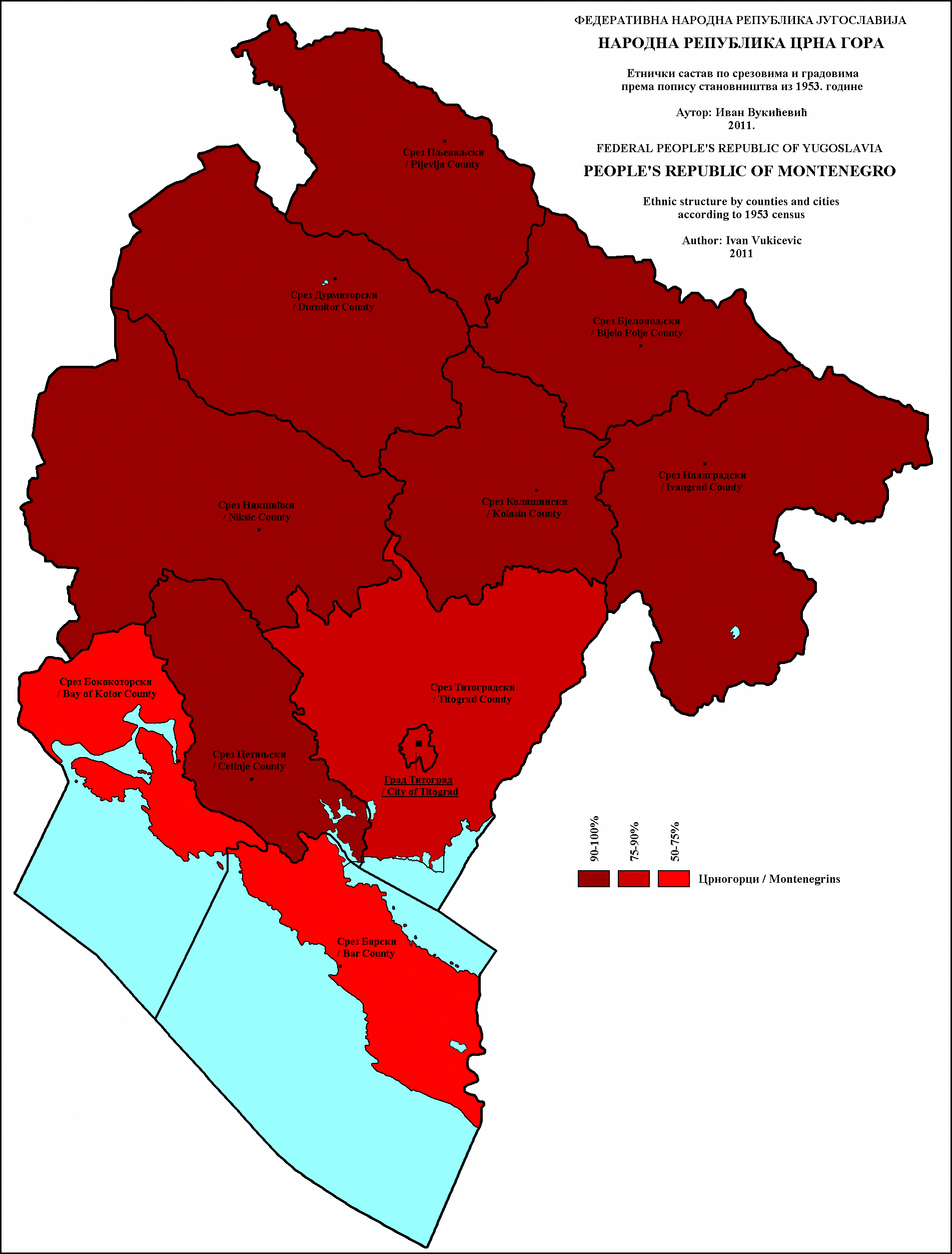
Ethnic structure of Montenegro by counties and cities 1953

== 1961 ==
The 1961 census results:

Inhabitants of Montenegro, 1961 census
Montenegrins	383,988 (81.37%)
ethnic Muslims	30,665 (6.5%)
Albanians	25,803 (5.47%)
Serbs	14,087 (2.99%)
Croats	10,664 (2.26%)
Yugoslavs	1,559 (0.33%)
Total: 471,894 inhabitants

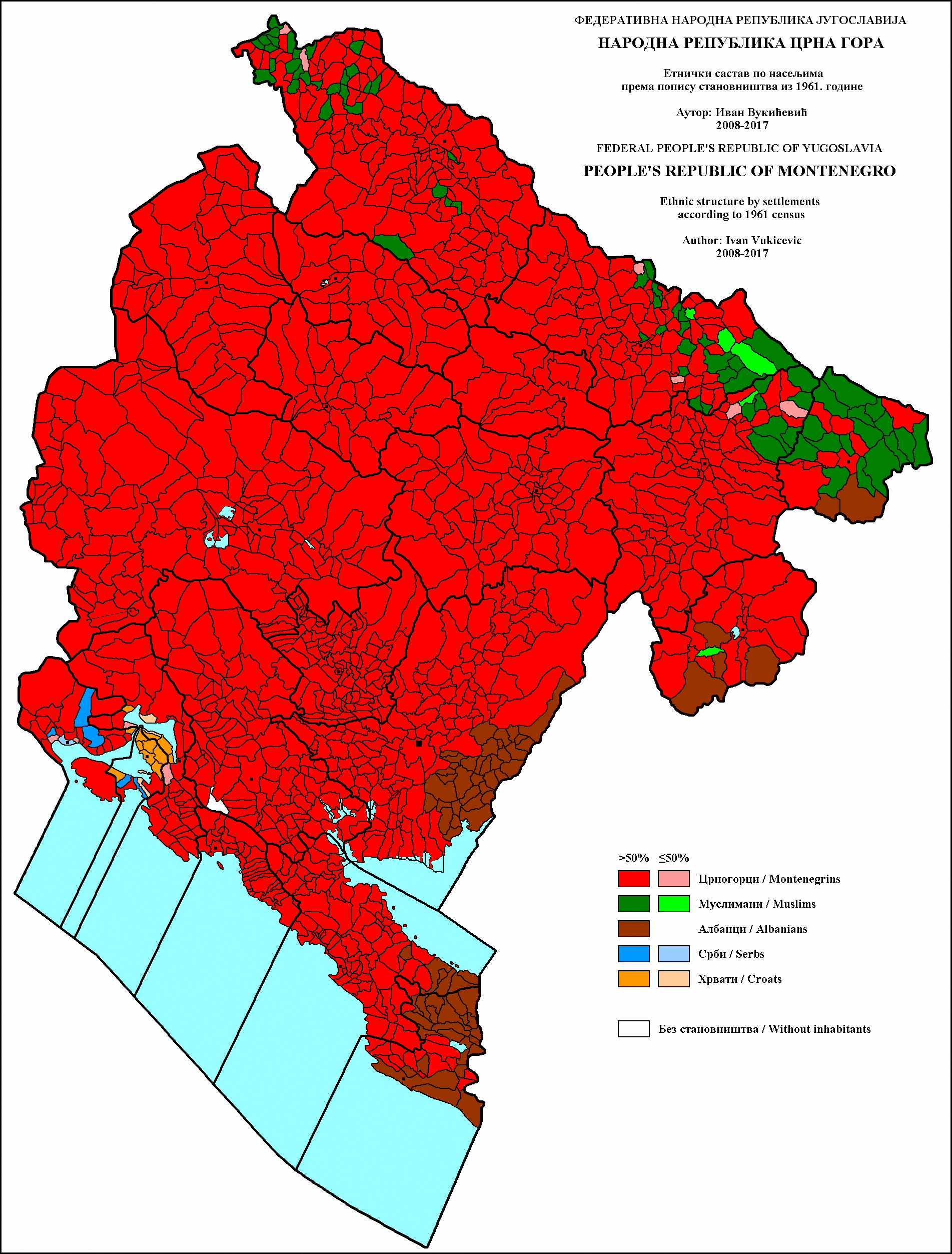
Ethnic structure of Montenegro by settlements 1961

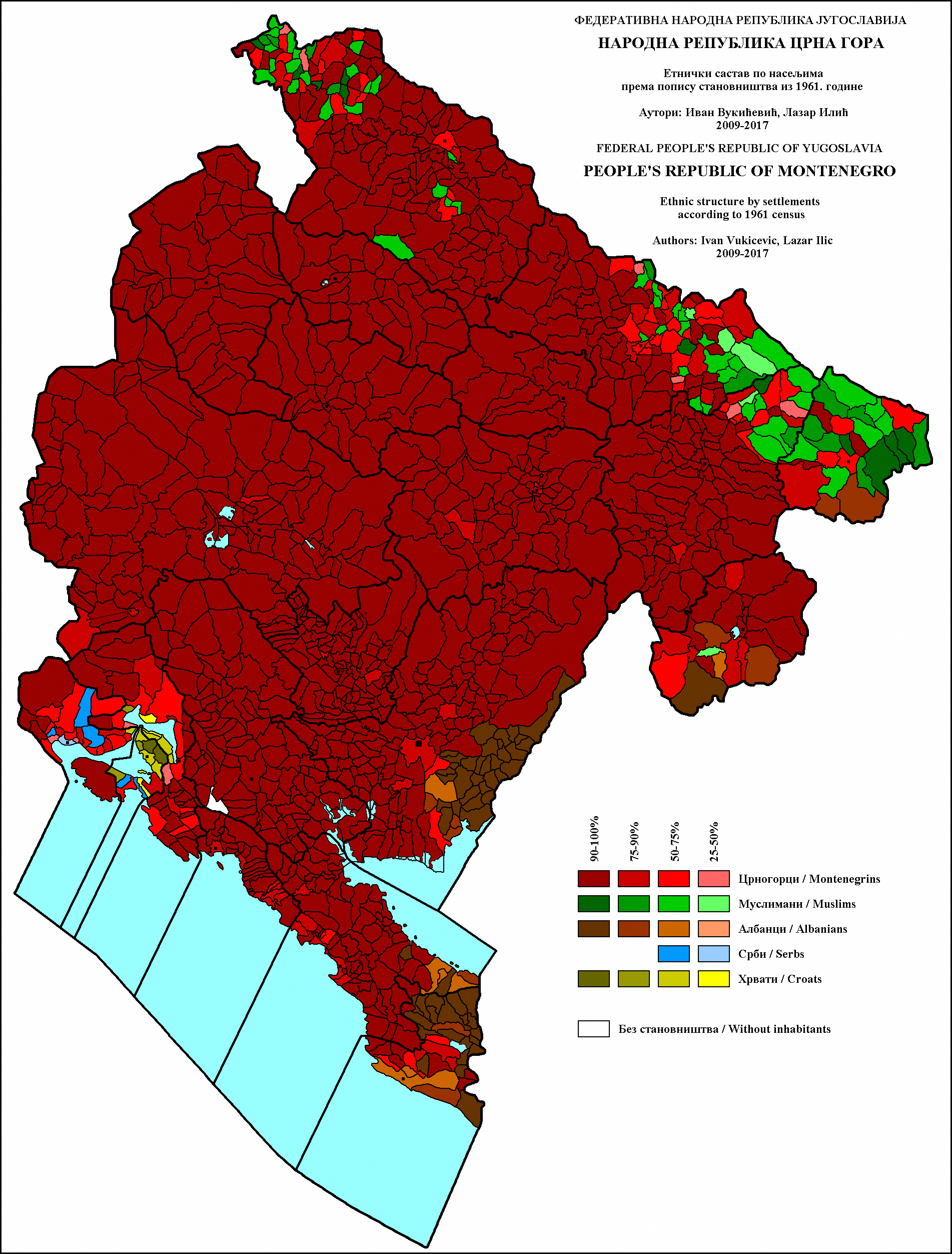
Ethnic structure of Montenegro by settlements 1961

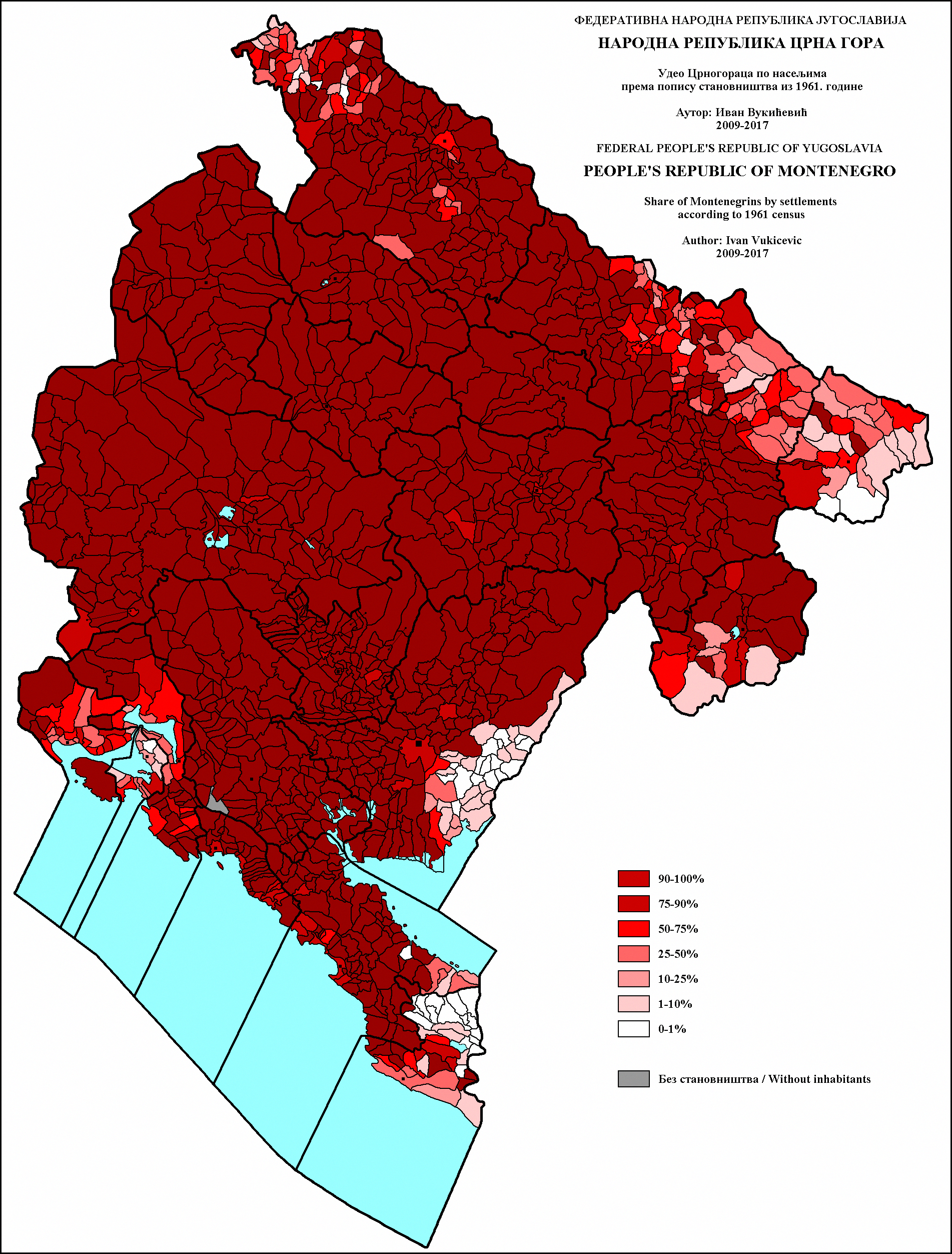
Share of Montenegrins in Montenegro by settlements 1961

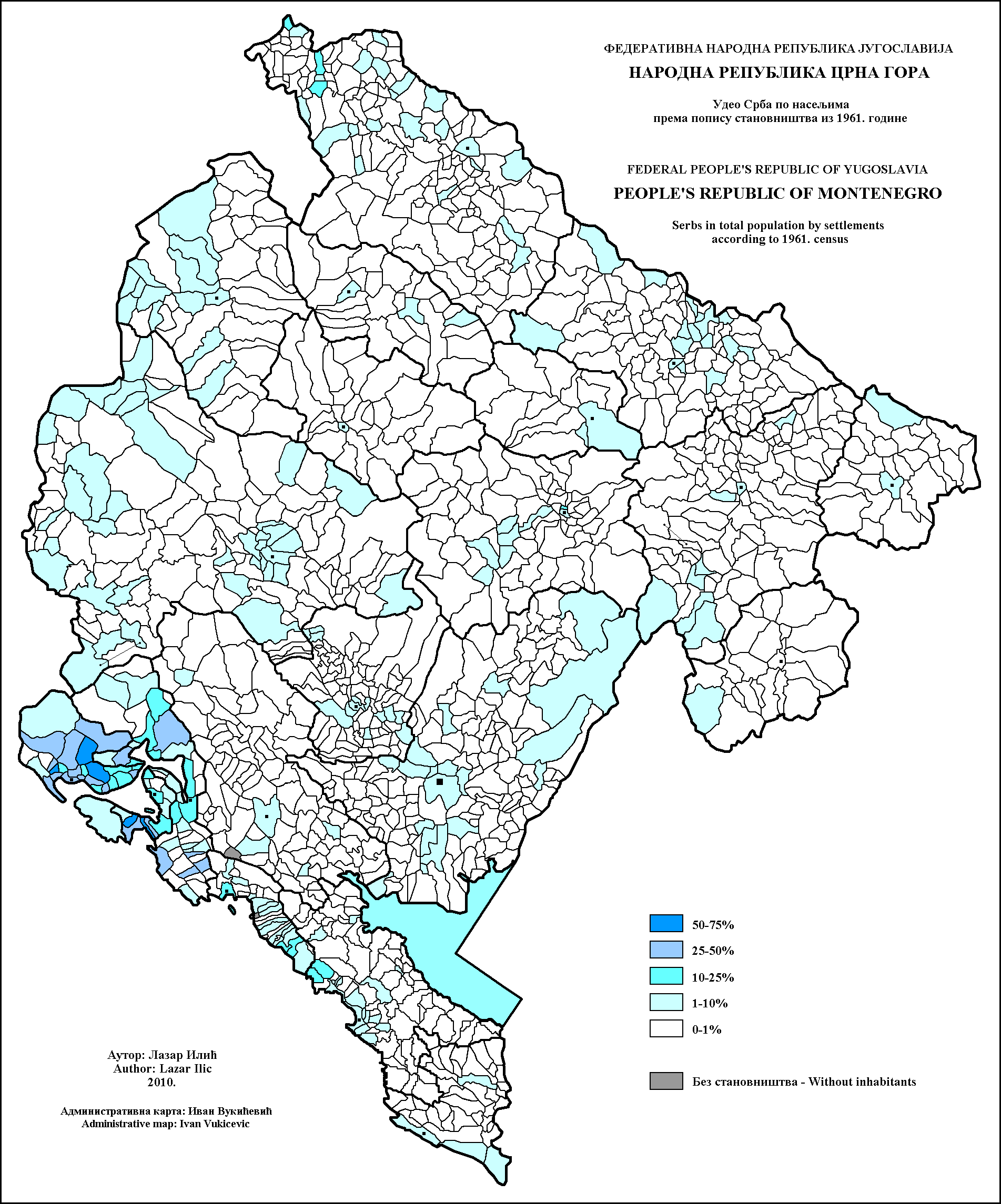
Share of Serbs in Montenegro by settlements 1961

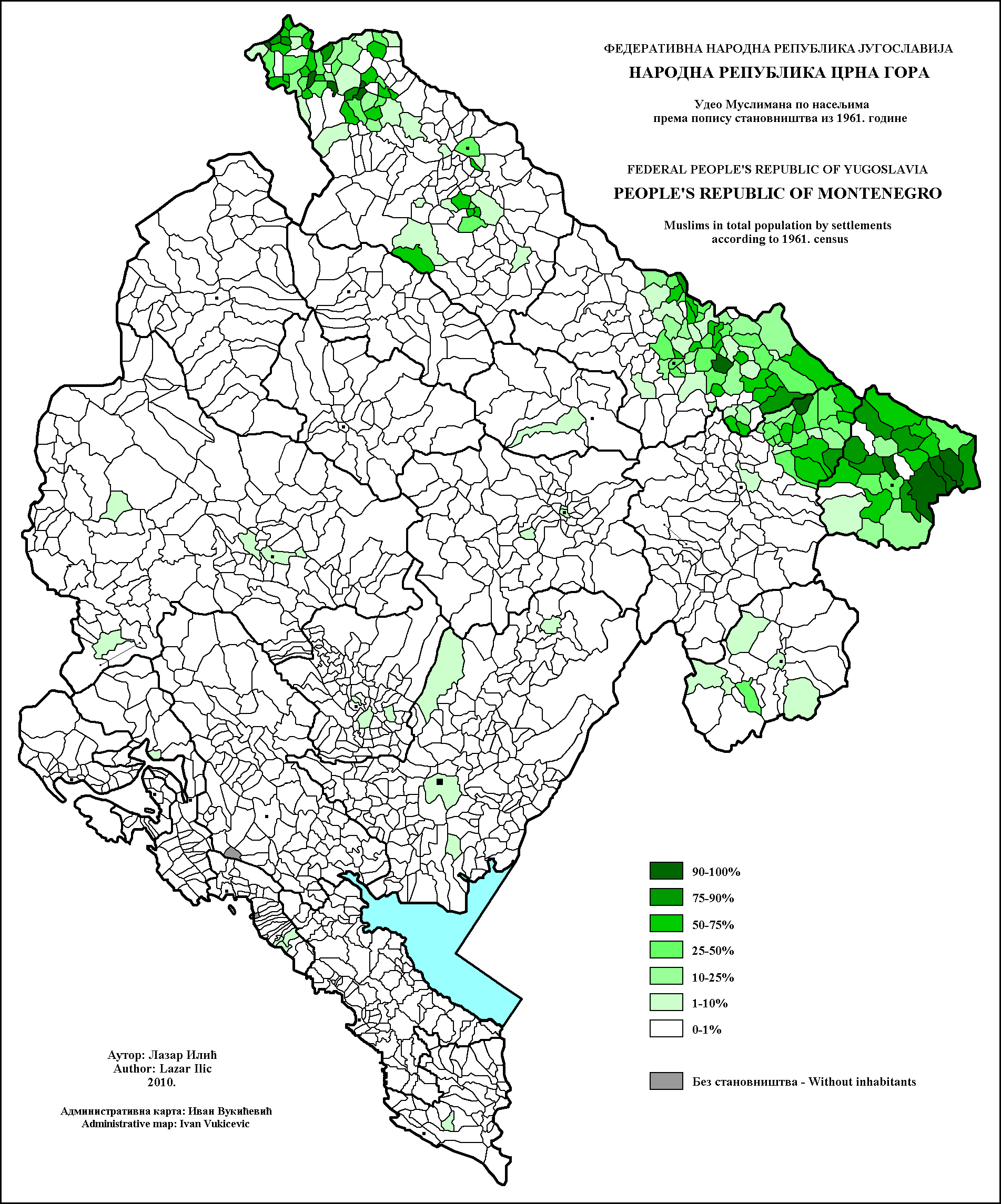
Share of Muslims in Montenegro by settlements 1961

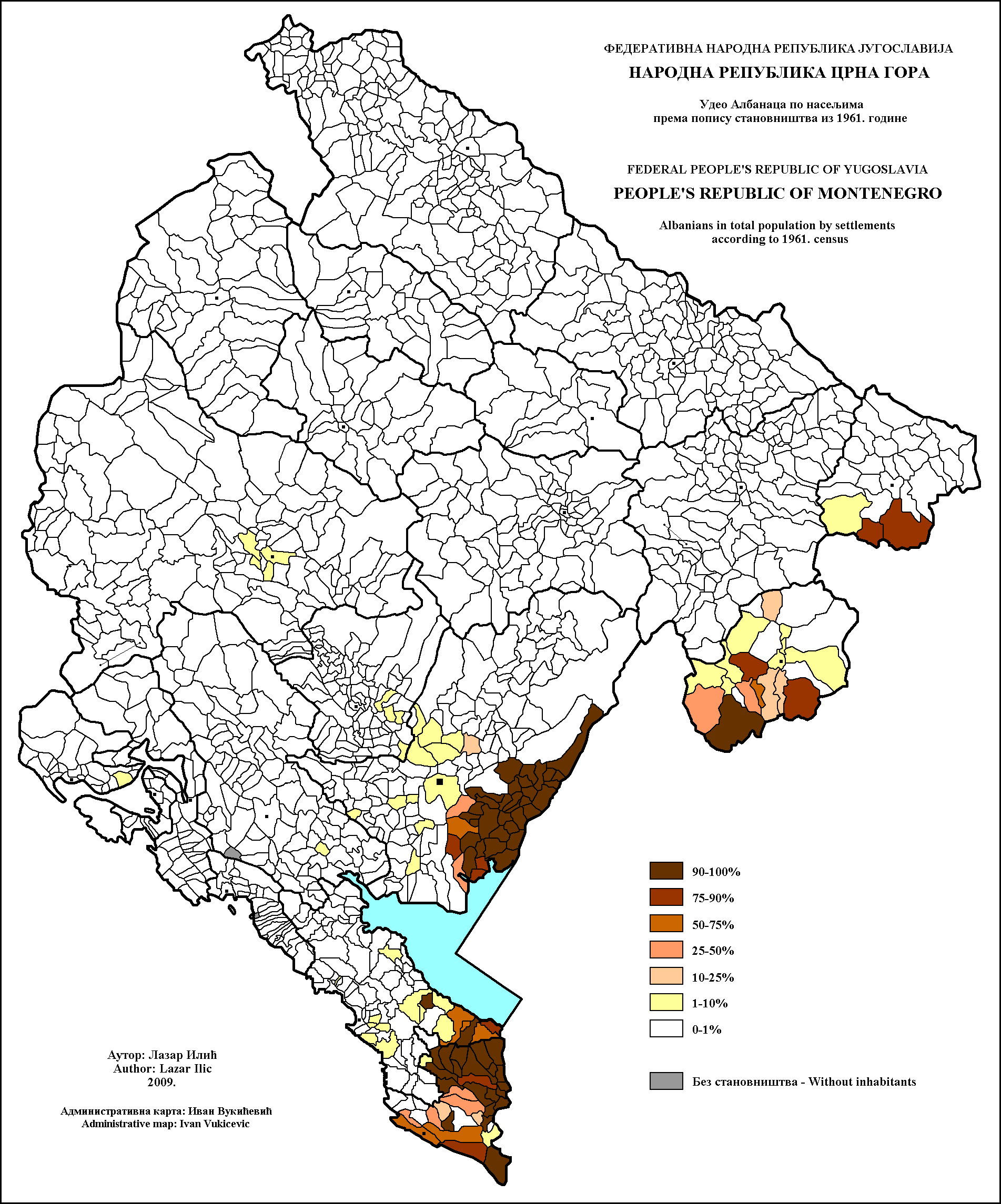
Share of Albanians in Montenegro by settlements 1961

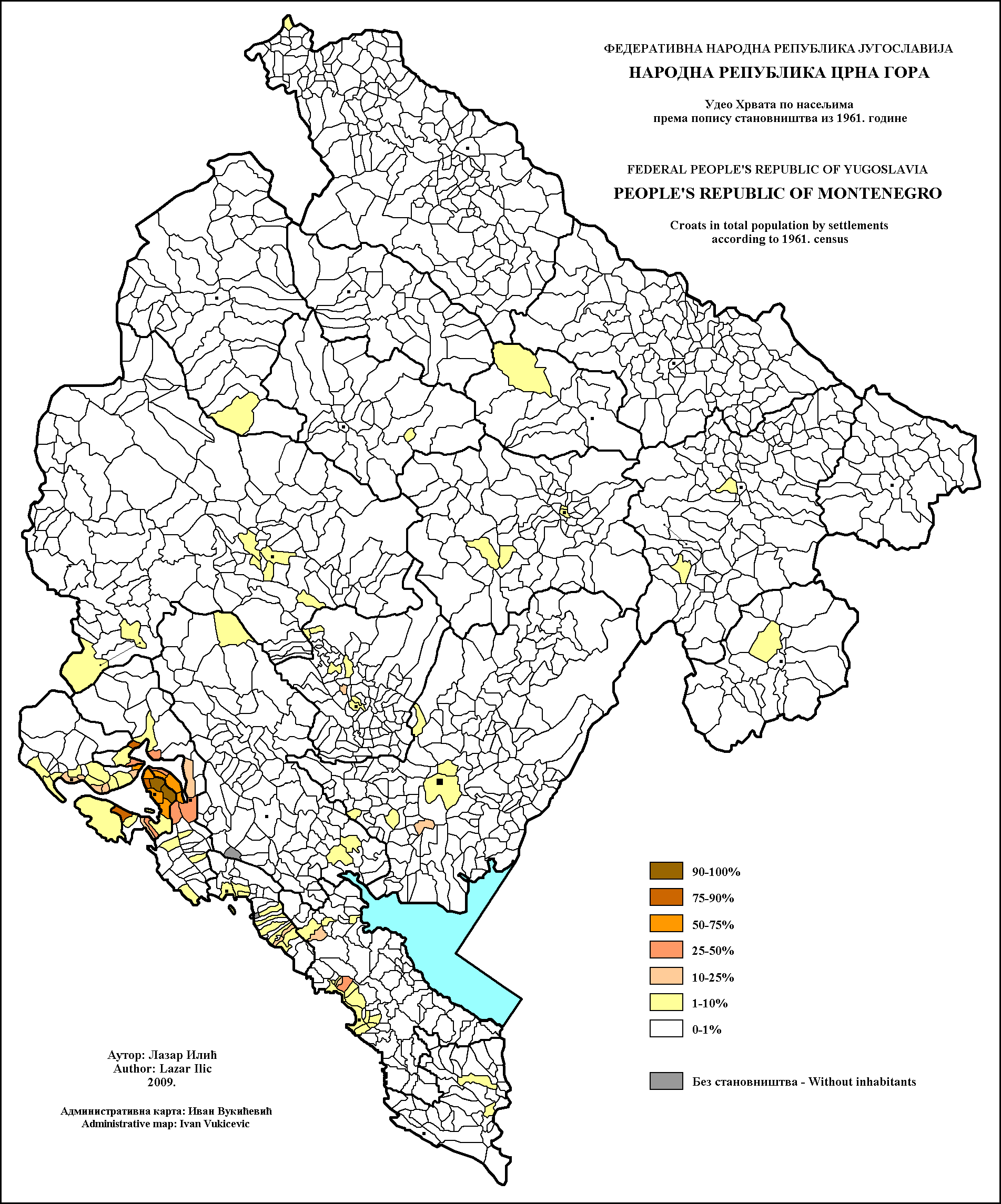
Share of Croats in Montenegro by settlements 1961

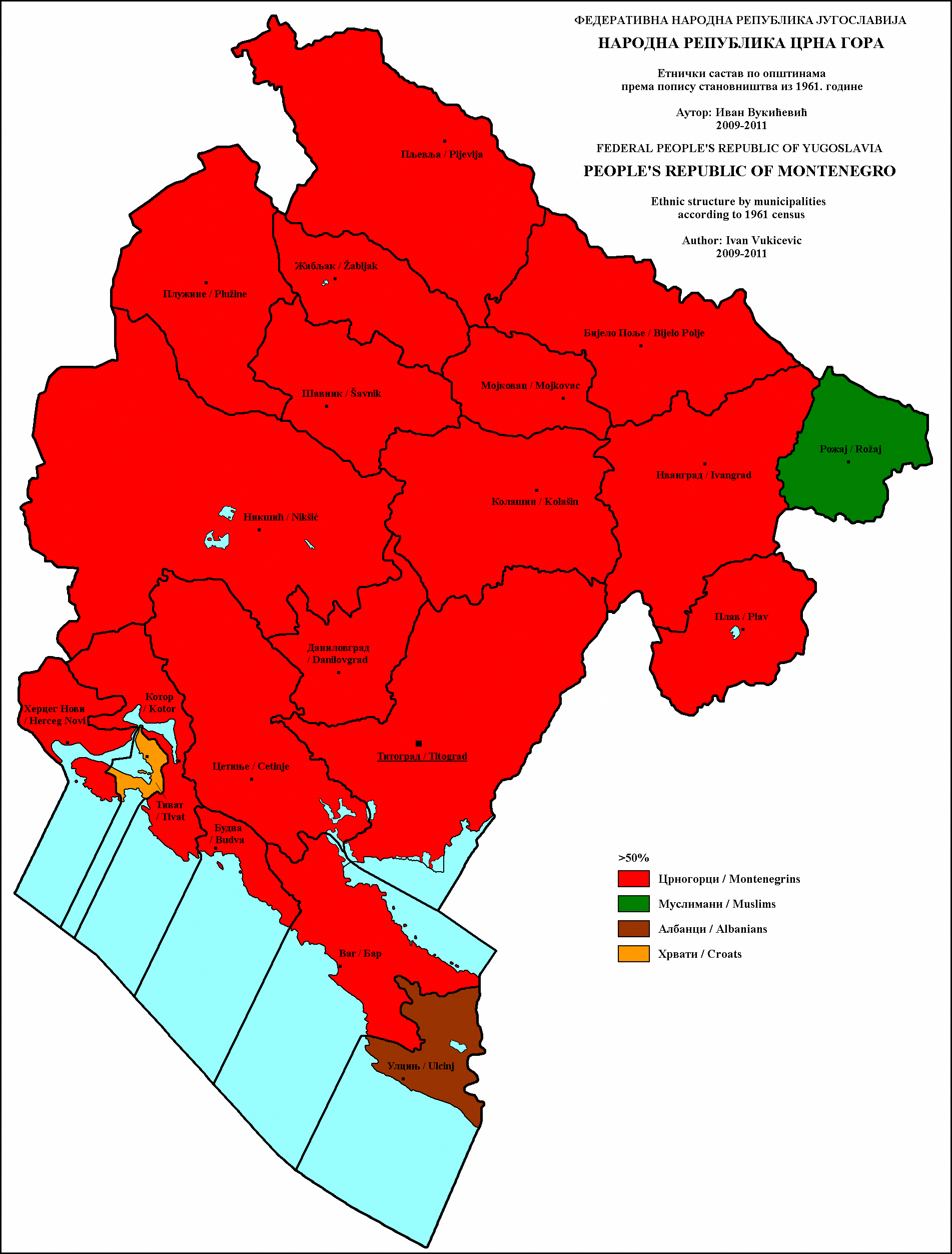
Ethnic structure of Montenegro by municipalities 1961

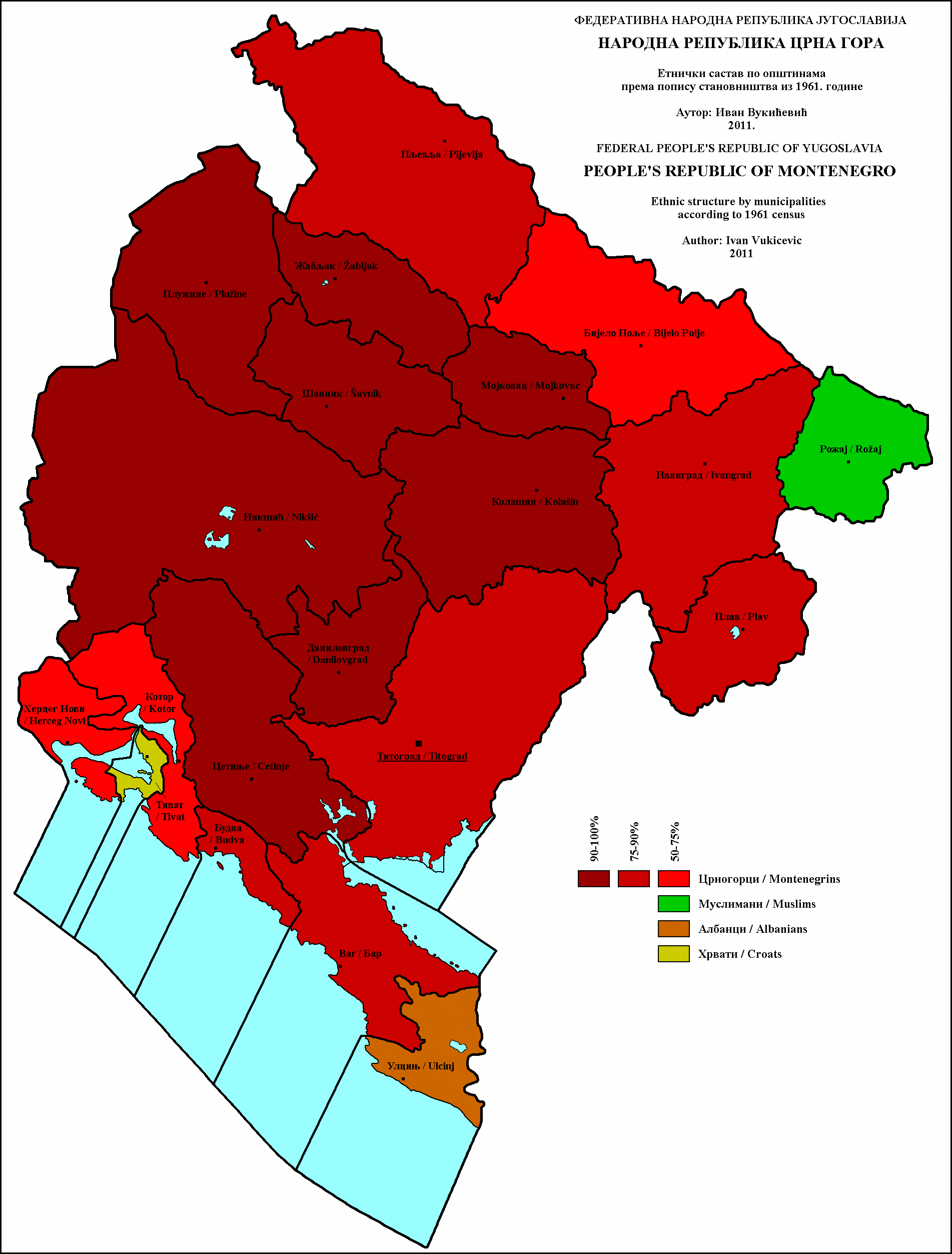
Ethnic structure of Montenegro by municipalities 1961

In 1968 the Communist Yugoslav government introduced a new category, ethnic Muslims.

== 1971 ==
Inhabitants of Montenegro, 1971 census
Montenegrins	355,632 (67.15%)
ethnic Muslims	70,236 (13.26%)
Serbs	39,512 (7.46%)
Albanians	35,671 (6.74%)
Yugoslavs	10,943 (2.07%)
Croats	9,192 (1.74%)
Total: 529,604 inhabitants

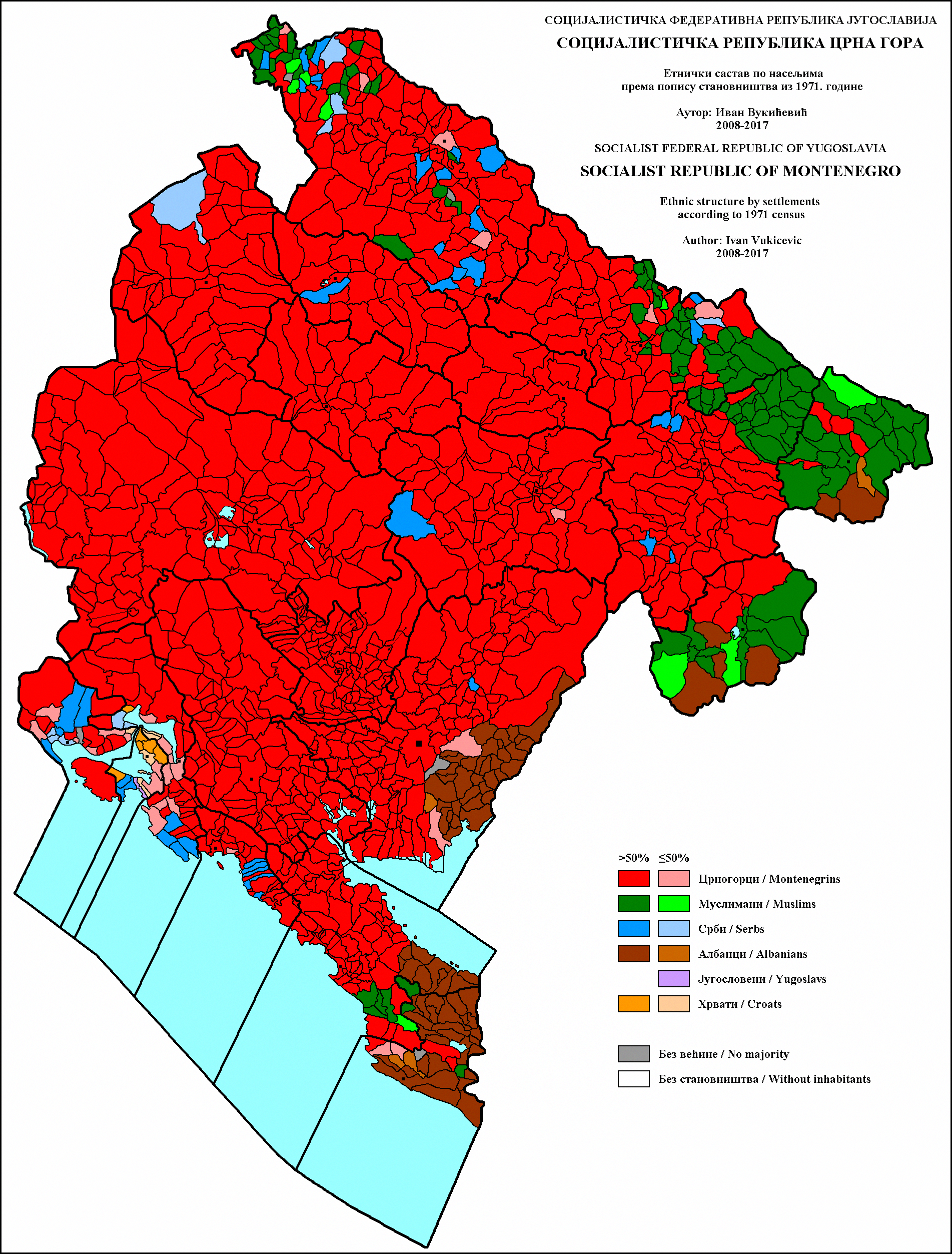
Ethnic structure of Montenegro by settlements 1971

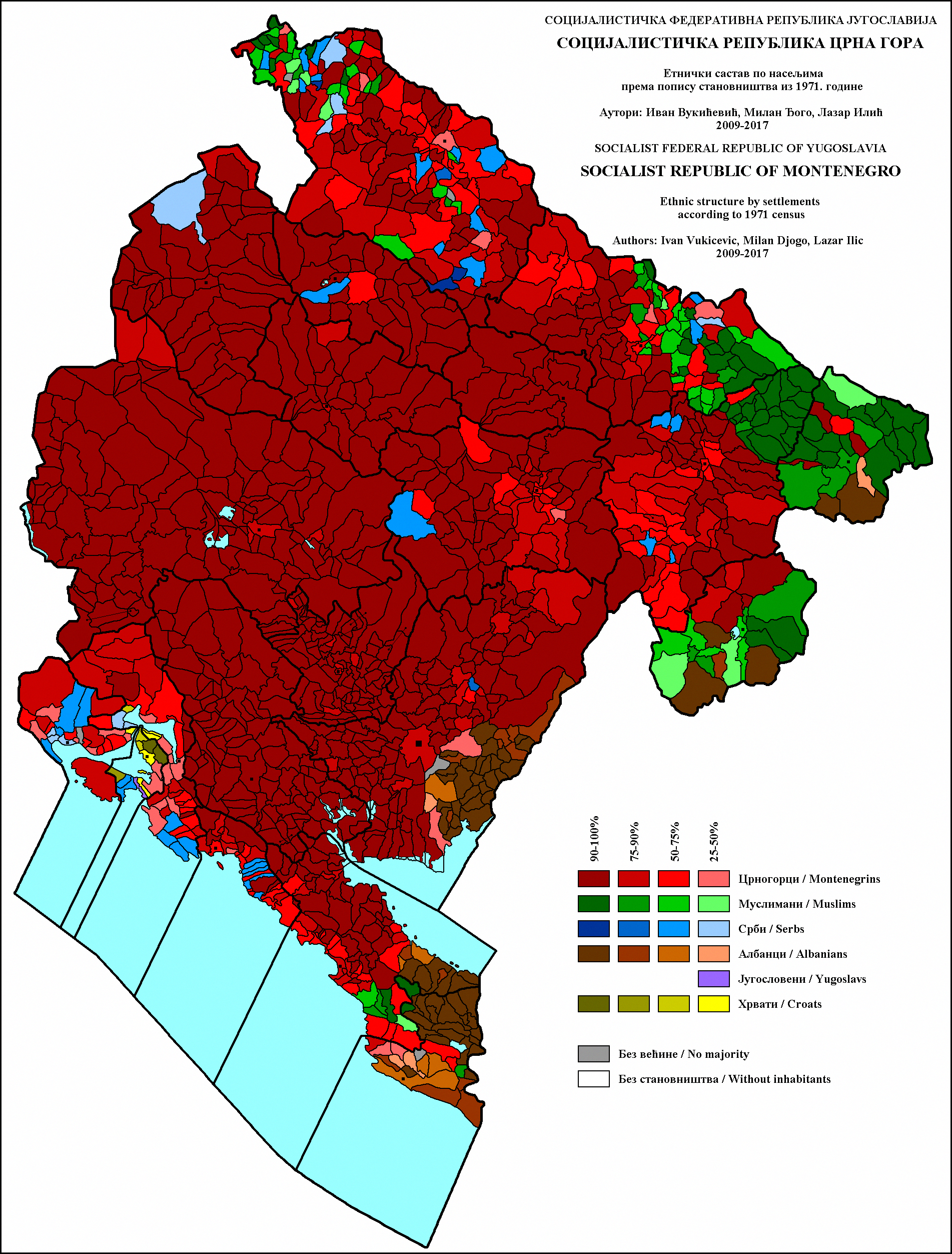
Ethnic structure of Montenegro by settlements 1971

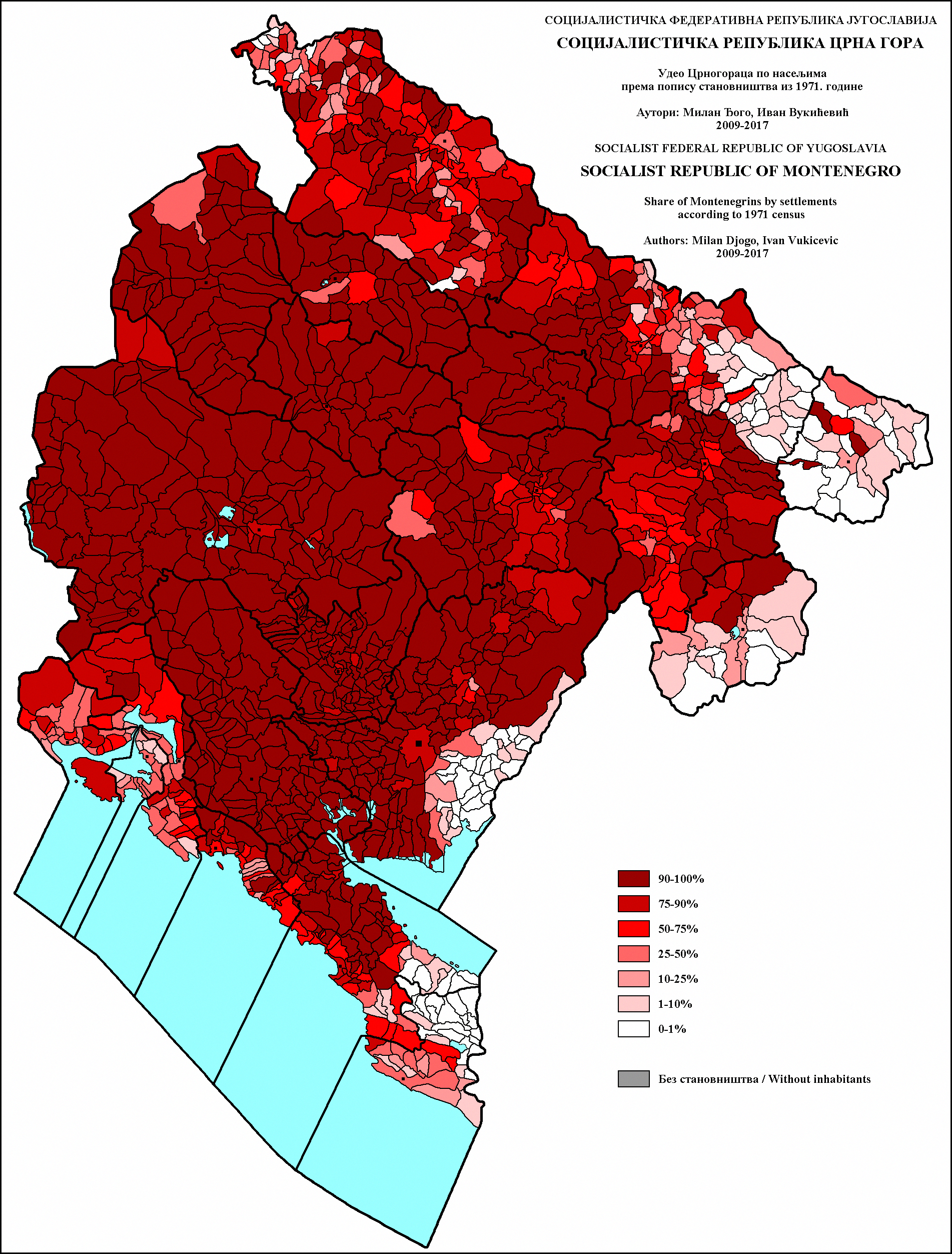
Share of Montenegrins in Montenegro by settlements 1971

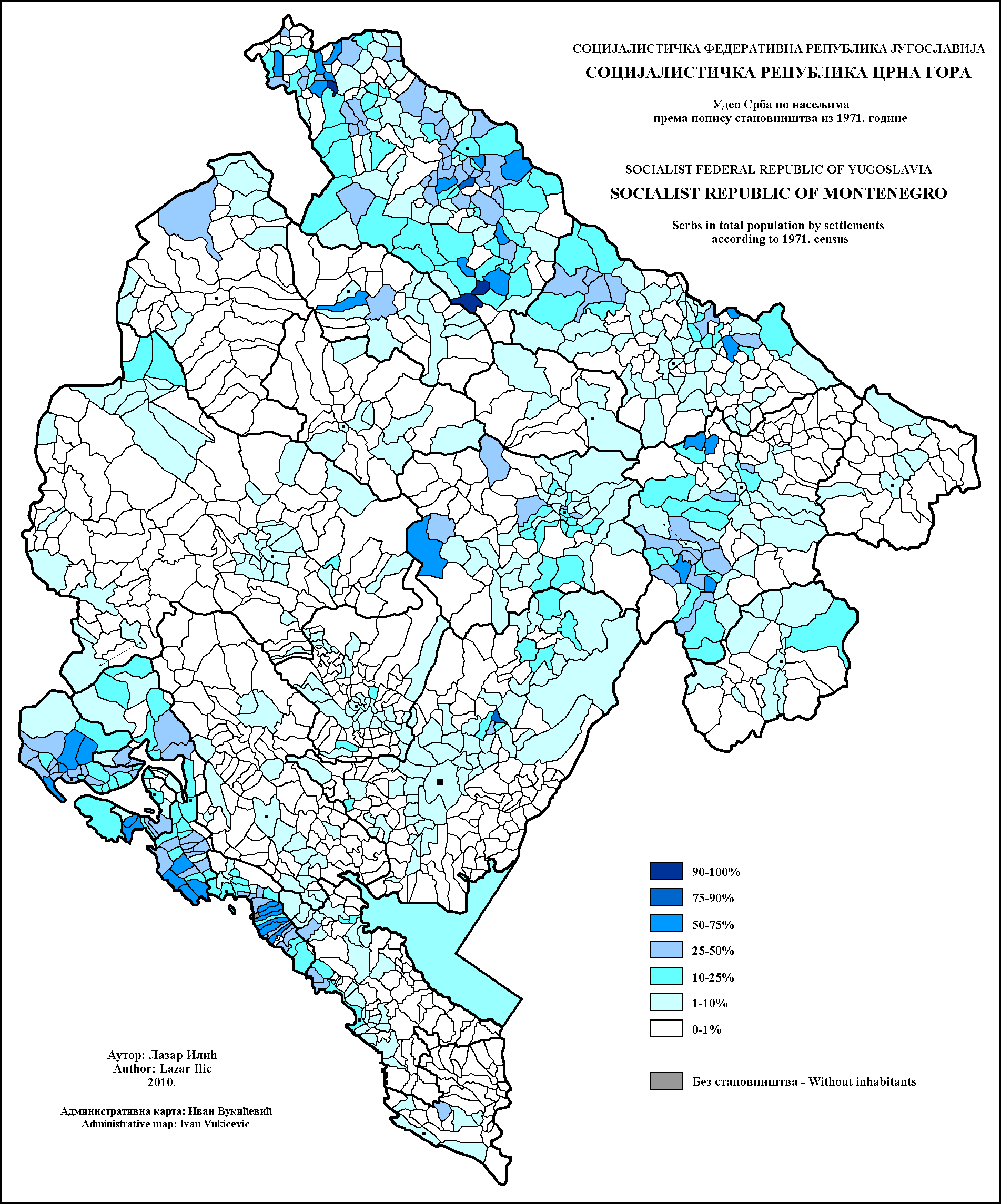
Share of Serbs in Montenegro by settlements 1971

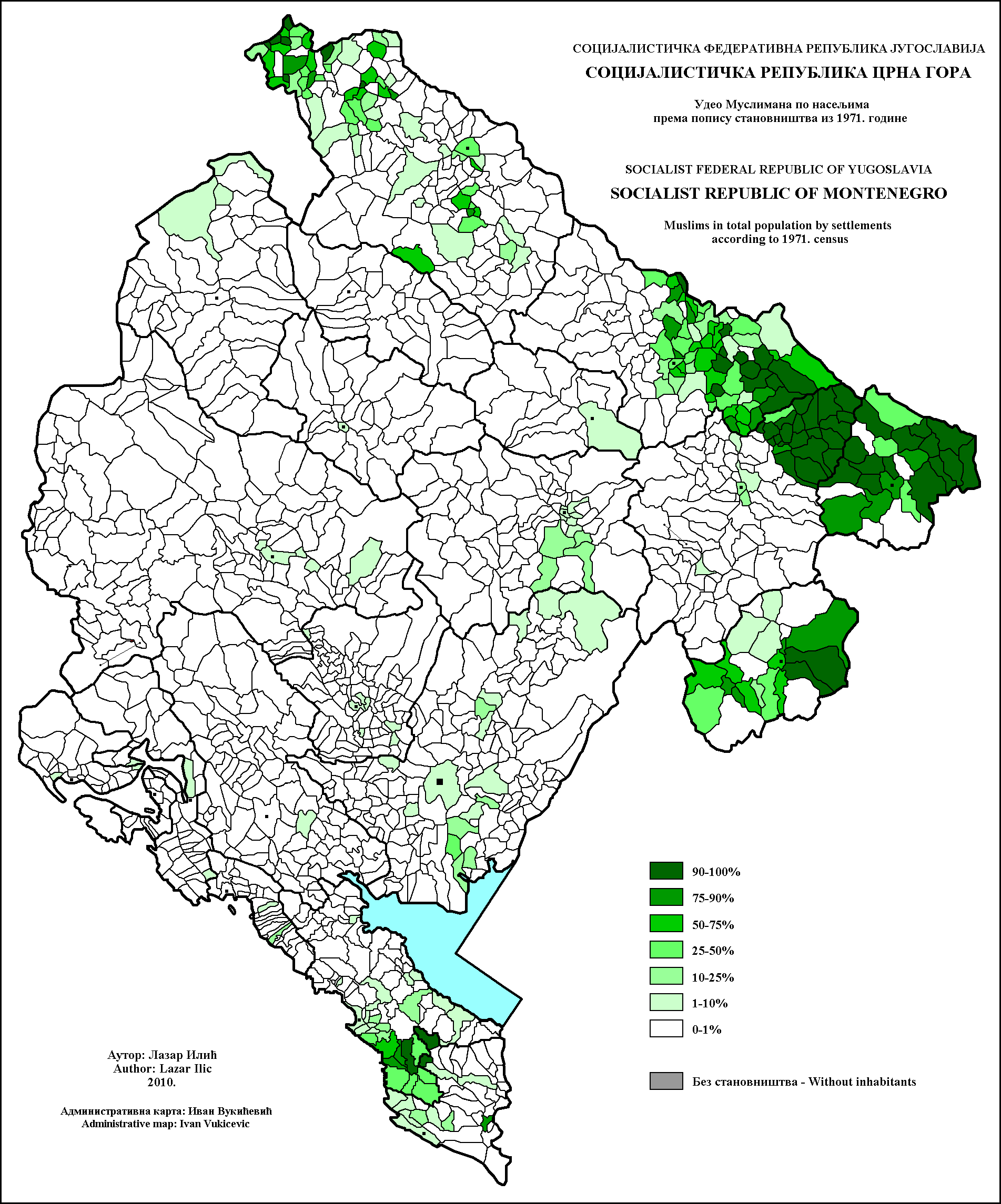
Share of Muslims in Montenegro by settlements 1971

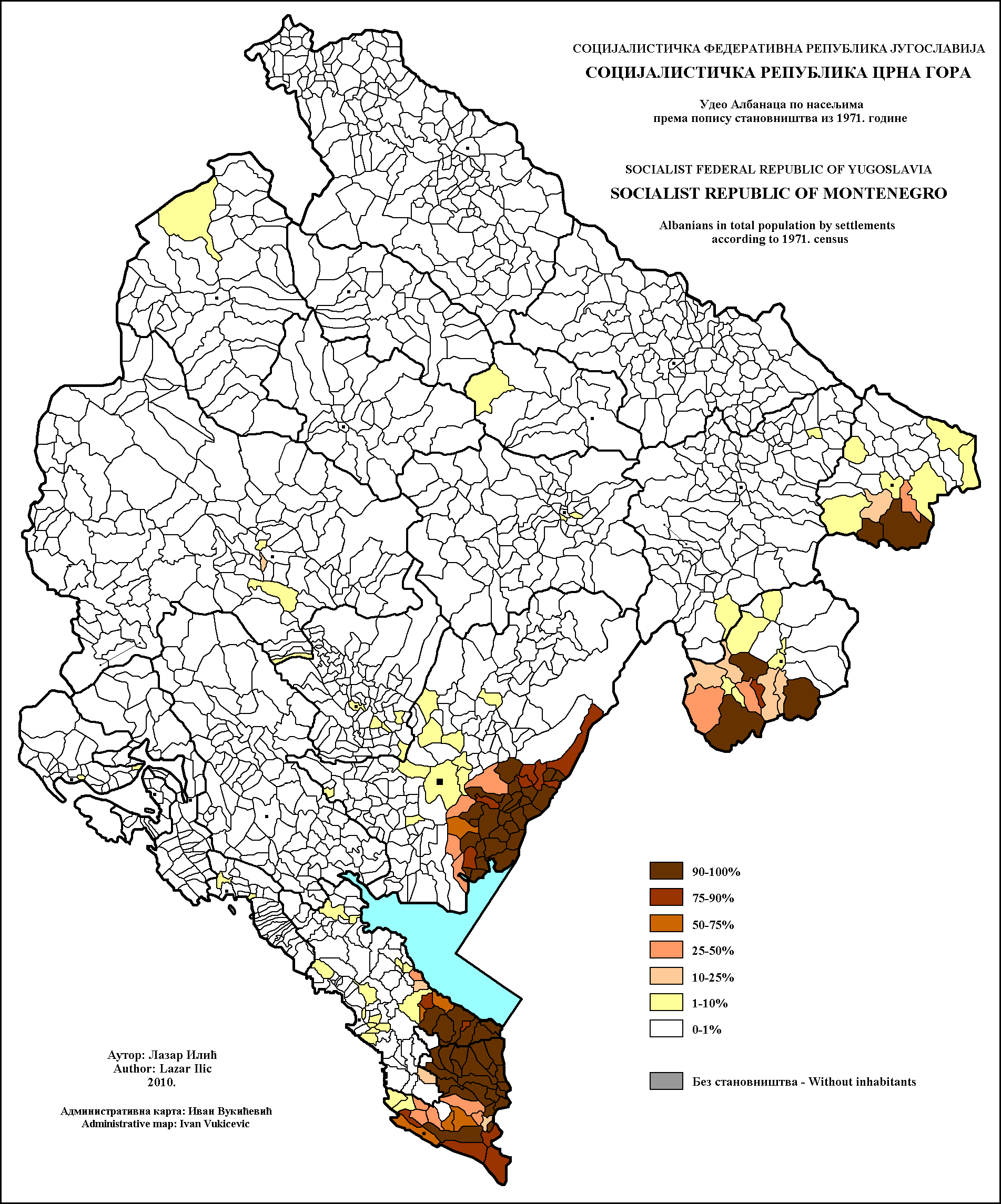
Share of Albanians in Montenegro by settlements 1971

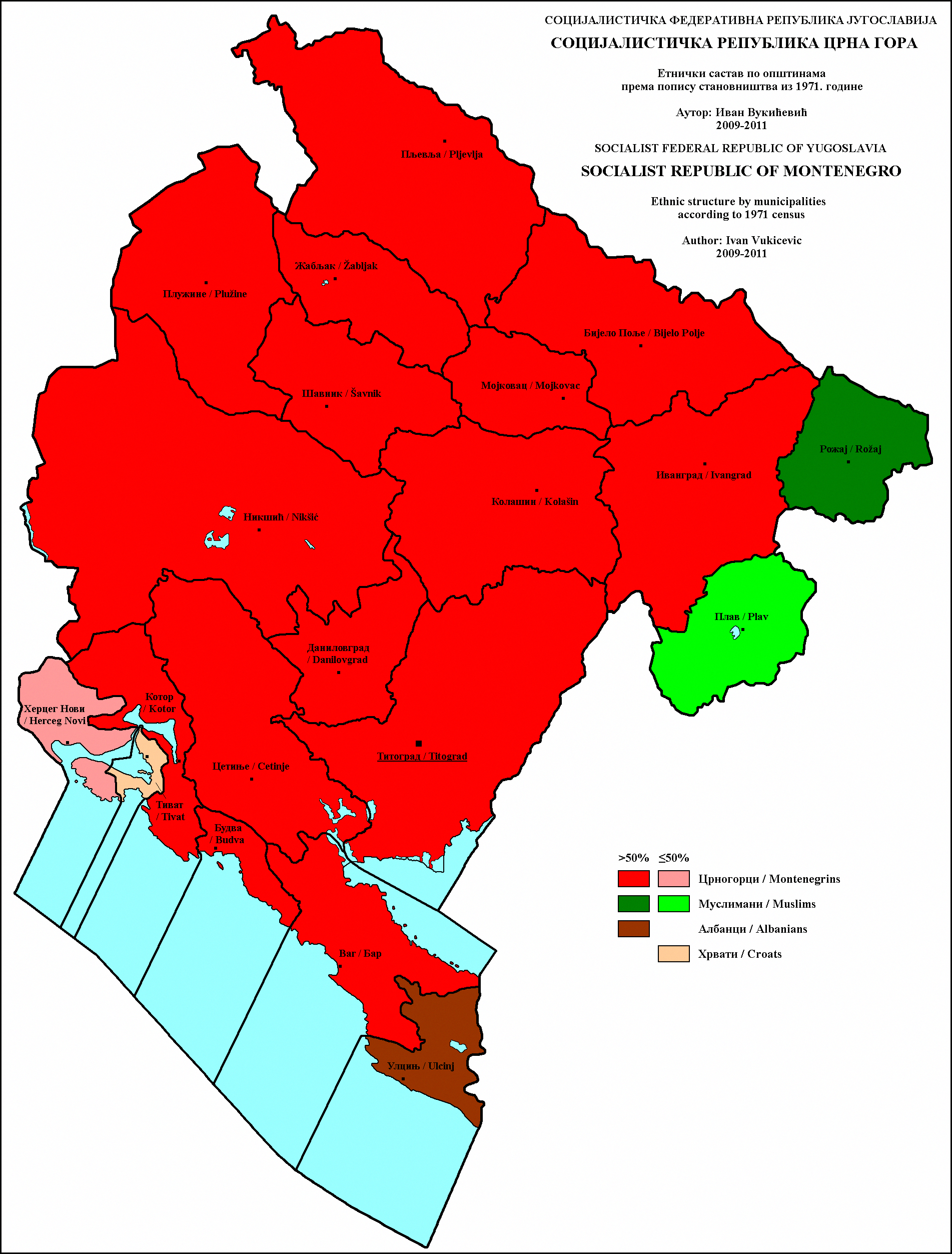
Ethnic structure of Montenegro by municipalities 1971

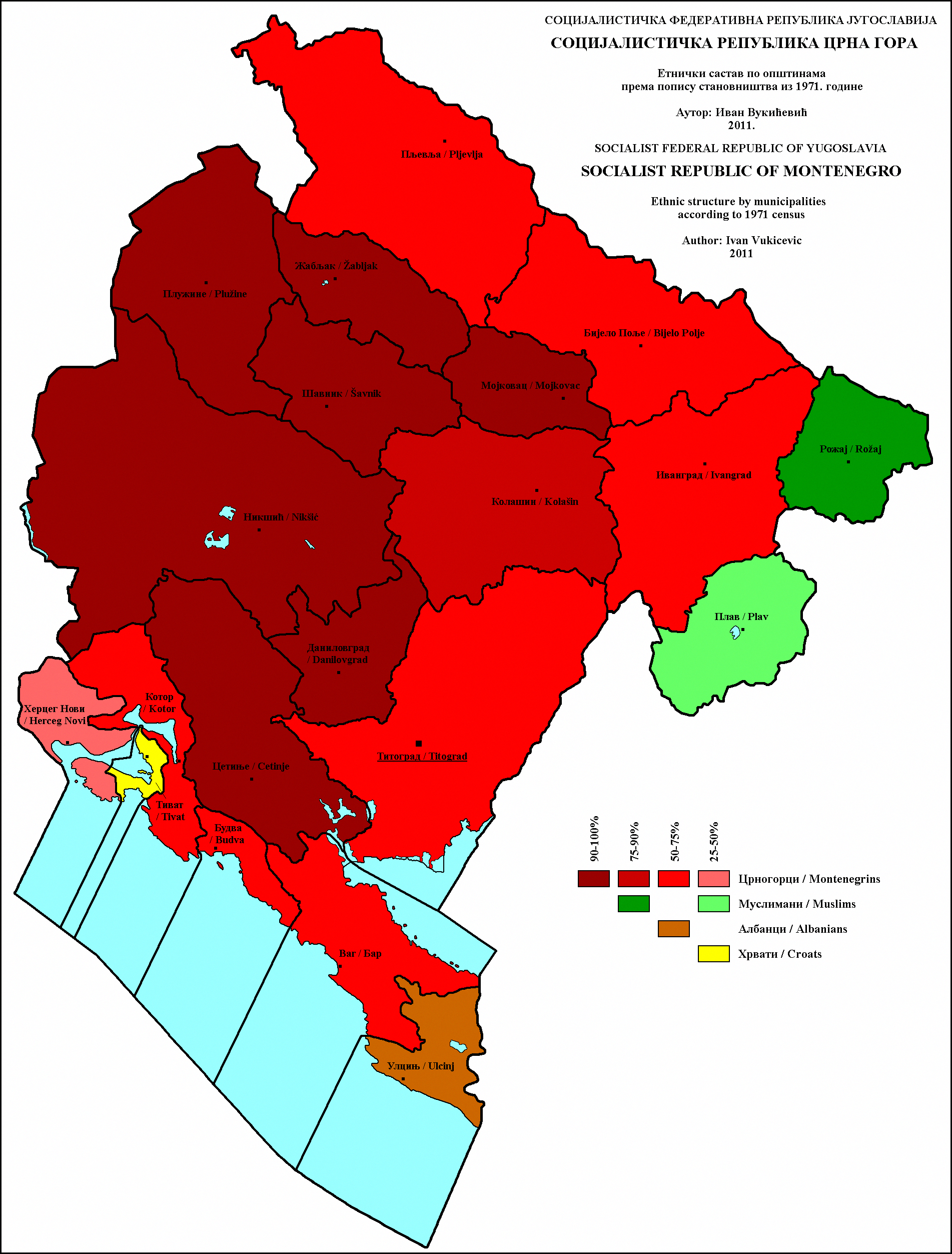
Ethnic structure of Montenegro by municipalities 1971

== 1981 ==
The 1981 census results:

Total: 584,310 inhabitants

- Montenegrins: 400,488 (68.54%)
- ethnic Muslims: 78,080 (13.36%)
- Albanians: 37,735 (6.46%)
- Yugoslavs: 31,243 (5.35%)
- Serbs: 19,407 (3.32%)
- Croats: 6,904 (1.81%)
- Roma: 1,471 (0.25%)
- Macedonian: 875 (0.15%)
- Slovenes: 564 (0.1%)
- Hungarians: 238 (0.04%)
- Germans: 107 (0.02%)
- Russians: 96 (0.02%)
- Italians: 45 (0.01%)
- Other: 816 (0.14%)
- No response: 301 (0.05%)
- Regional affiliation: 1,602 (0.27%)
- Unknown: 4,338 (0.74%)
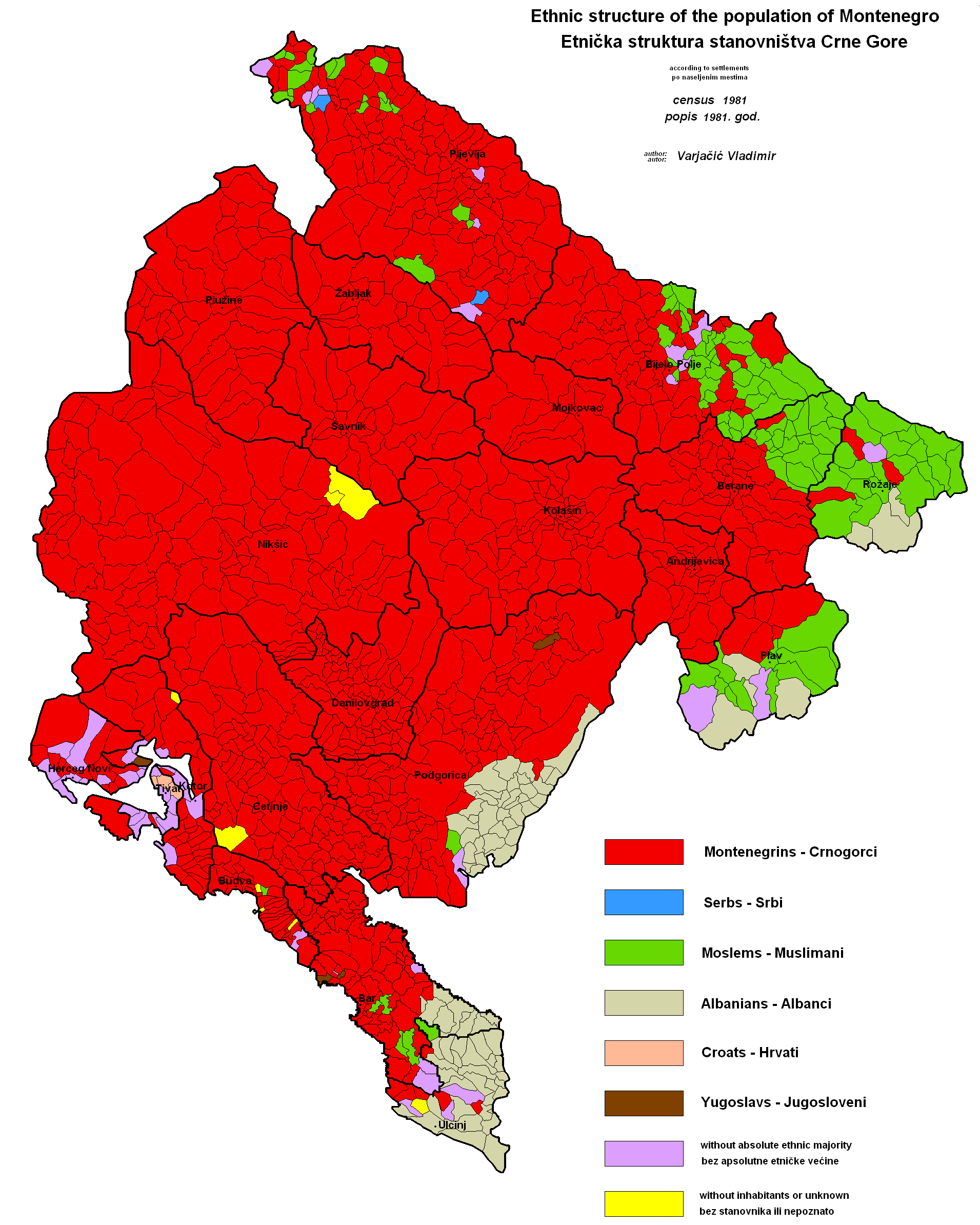
Ethnic structure of Montenegro by settlements 1981

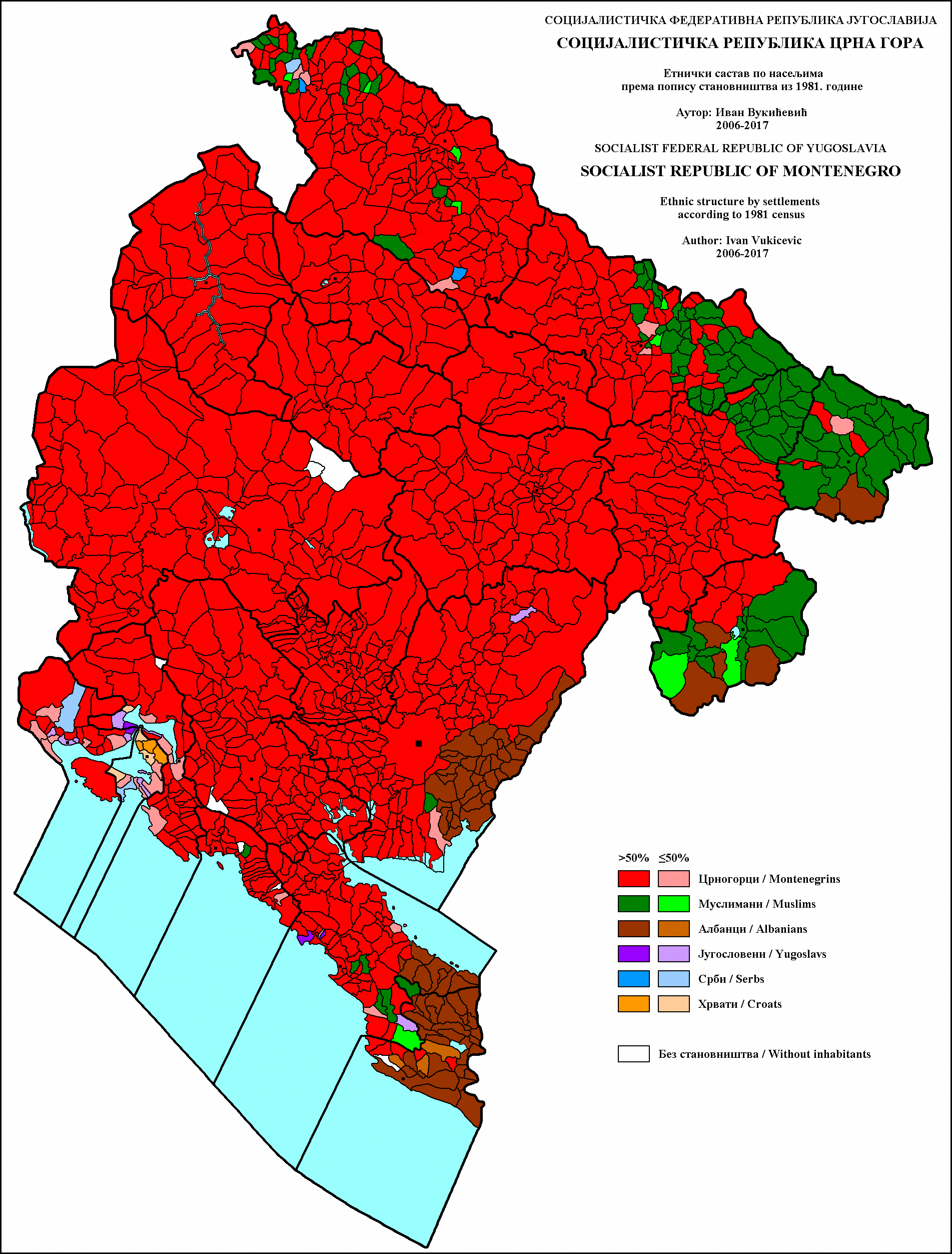
Ethnic structure of Montenegro by settlements 1981

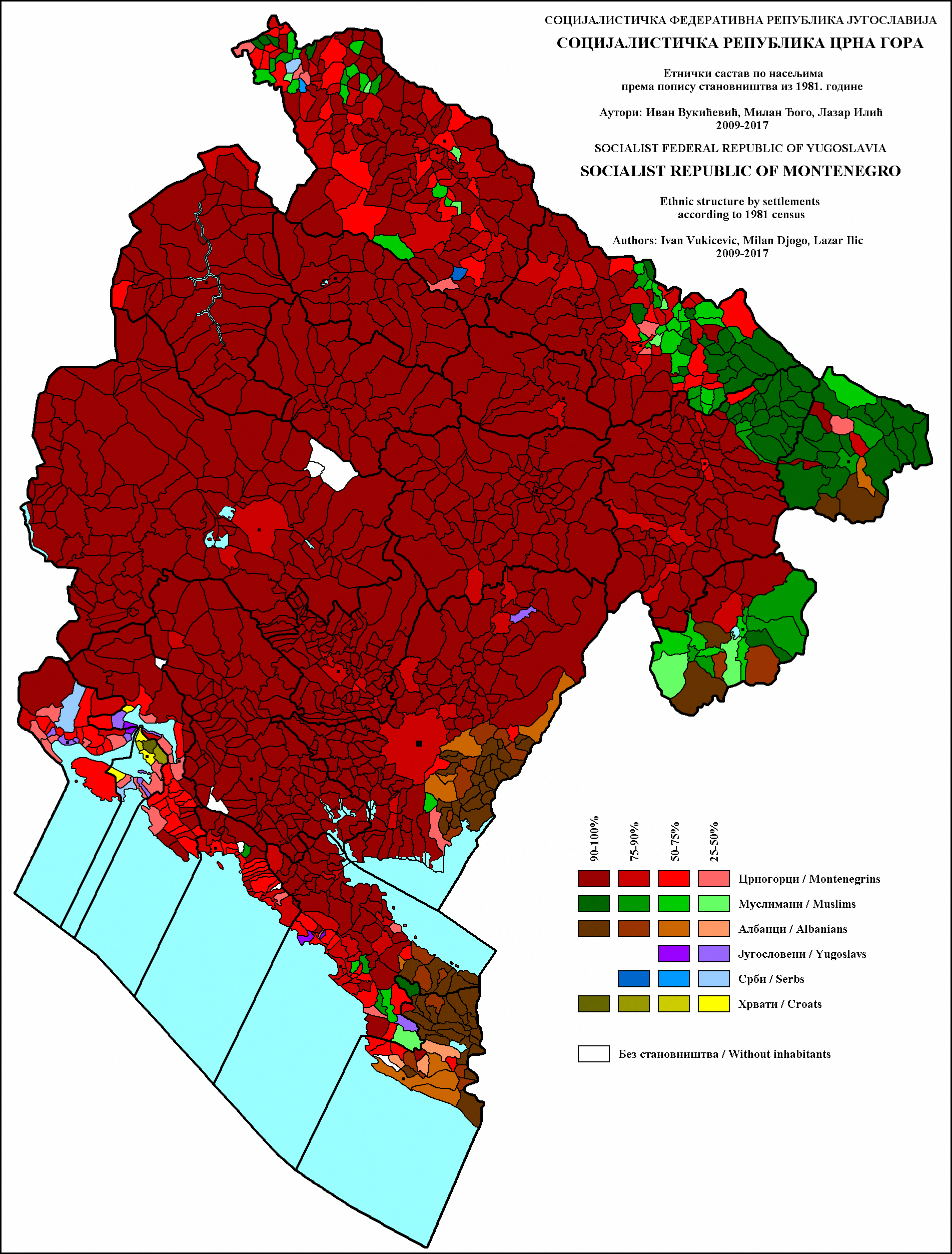
Ethnic structure of Montenegro by settlements 1981

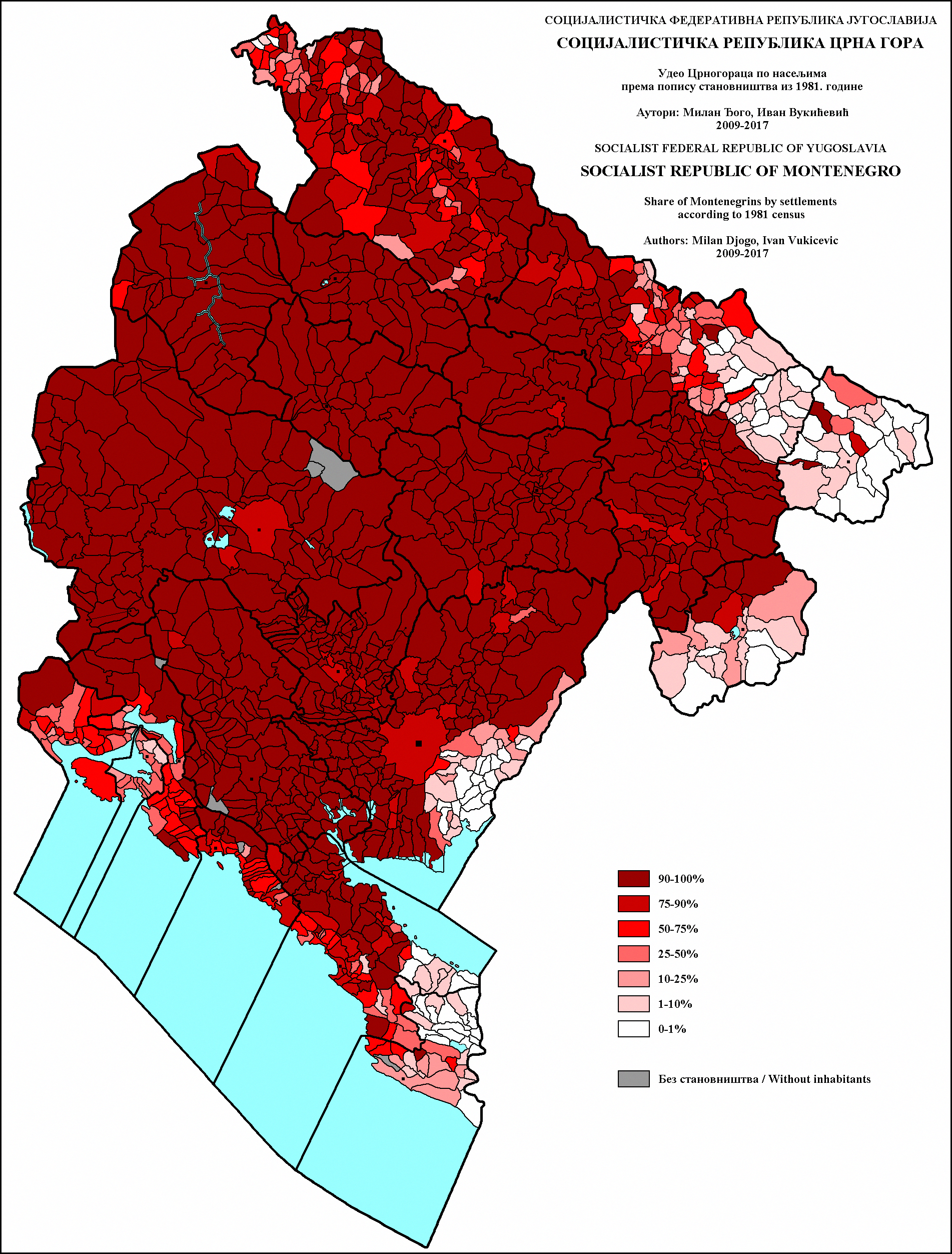
Share of Montenegrins in Montenegro by settlements 1981

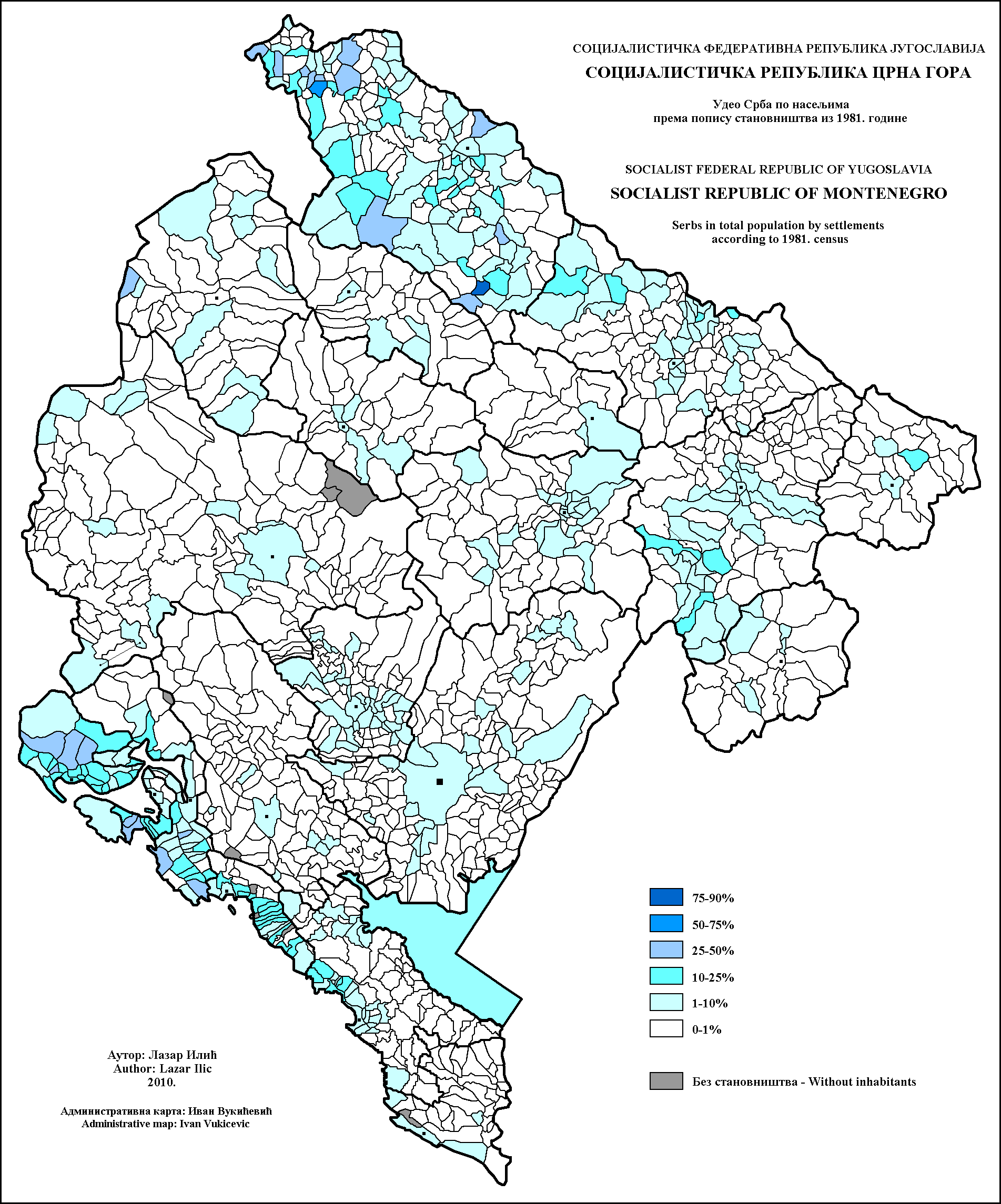
Share of Serbs in Montenegro by settlements 1981

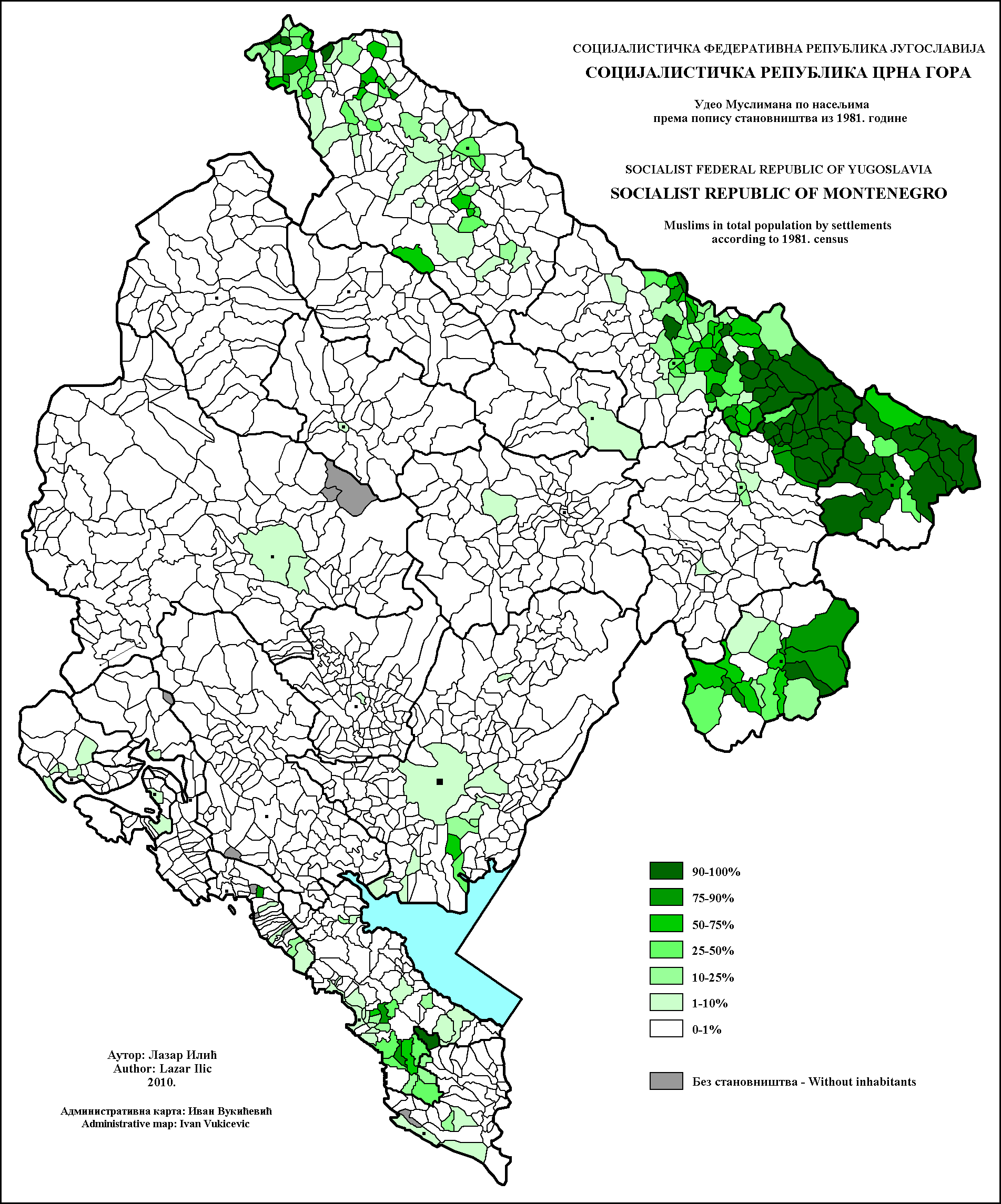
Share of Muslims in Montenegro by settlements 1981

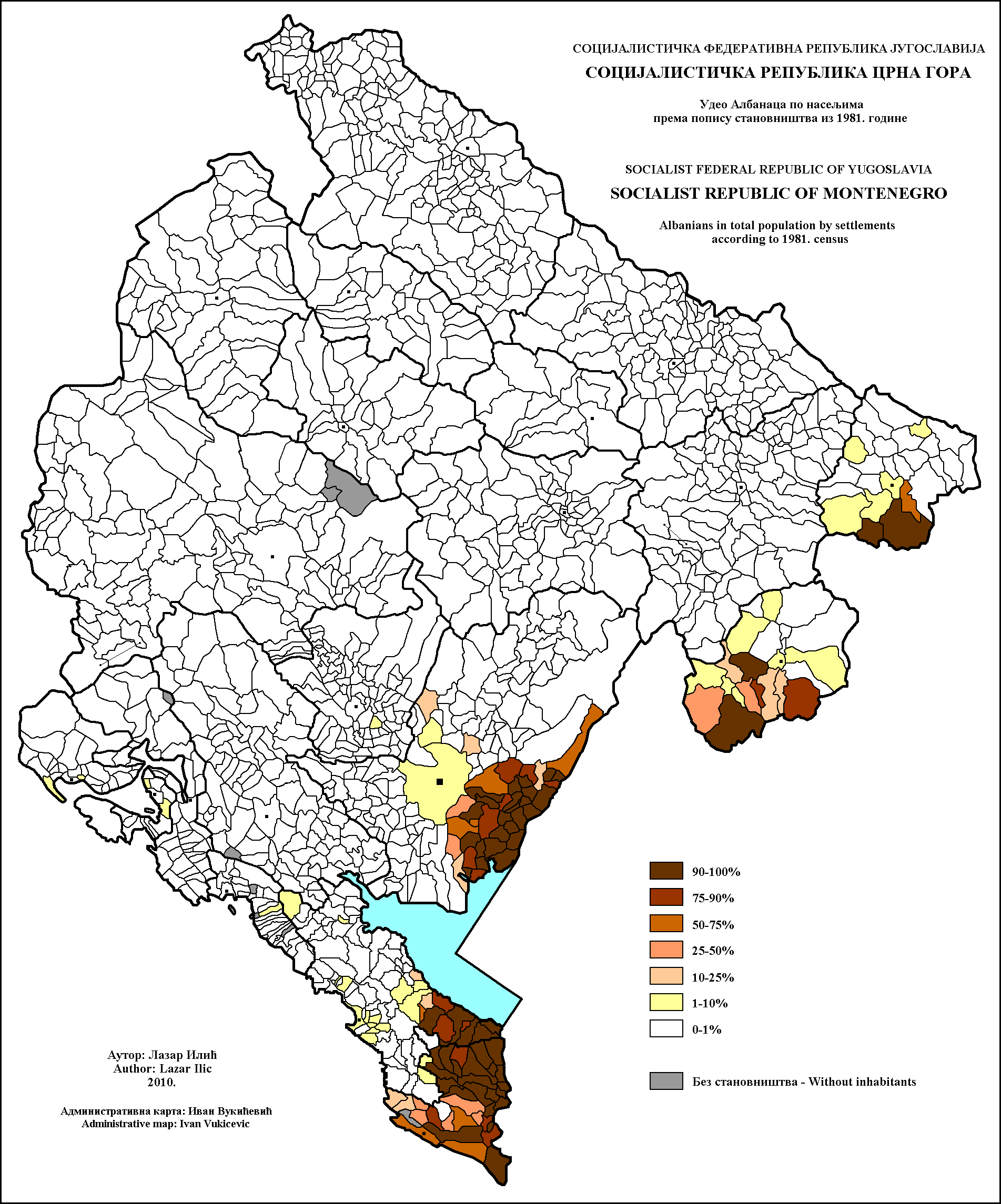
Share of Albanians in Montenegro by settlements 1981

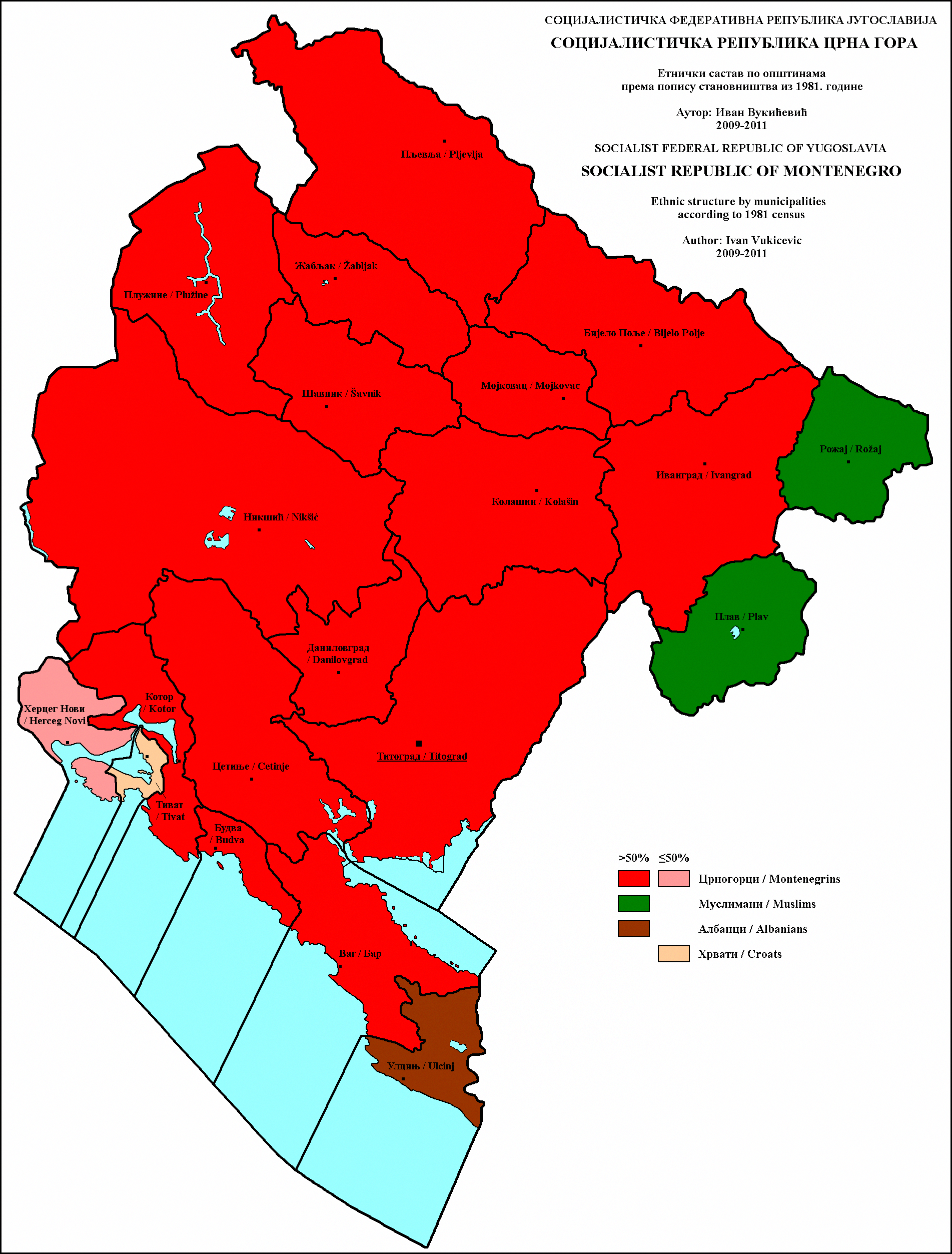
Ethnic structure of Montenegro by municipalities 1981

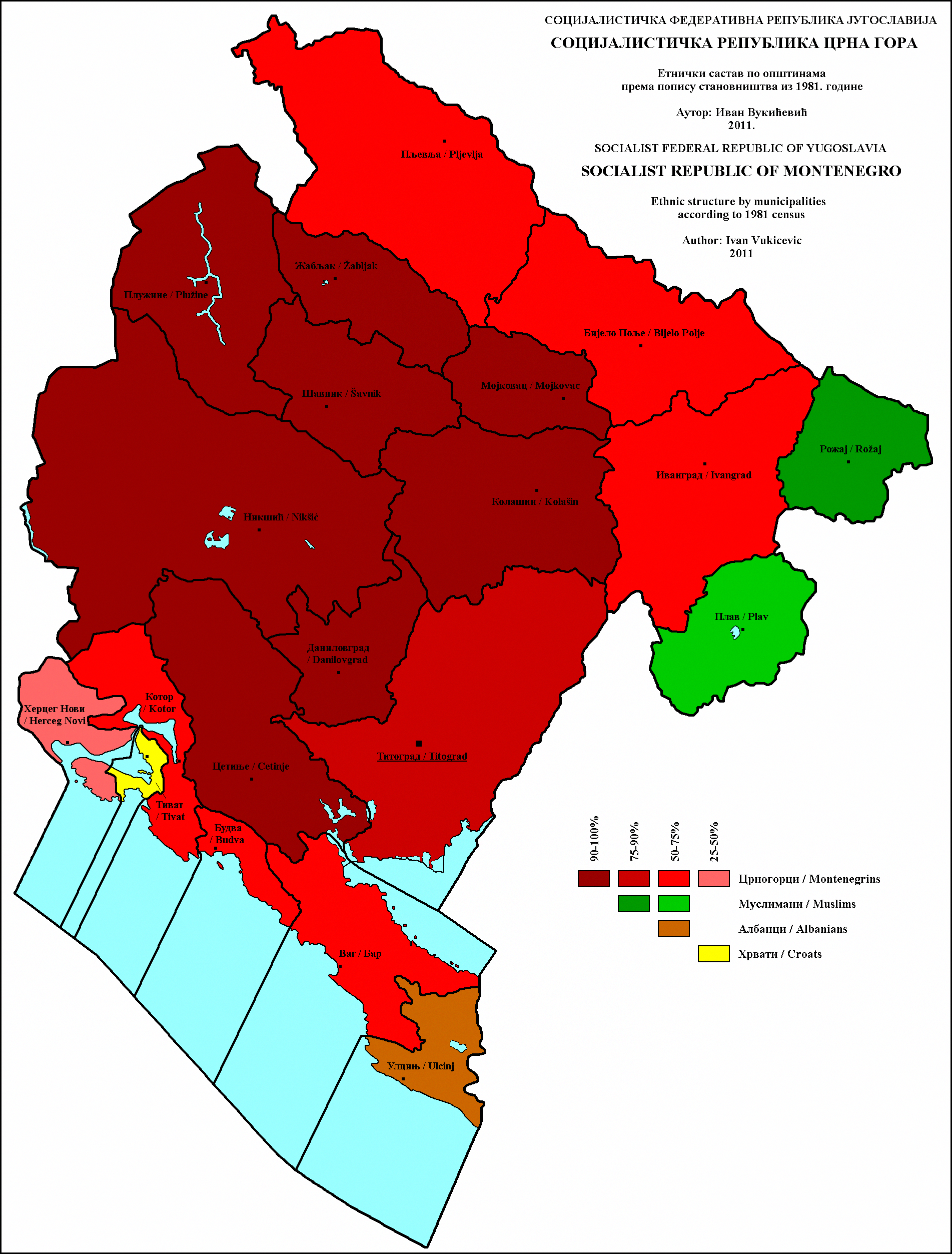
Ethnic structure of Montenegro by municipalities 1981

== 1991 ==
The 1991 census results:

Total: 615,035 inhabitants

=== Ethnic structure ===
- Montenegrins: 380,467 (61.86%)
- ethnic Muslims: 89,614 (14.57%)
- Serbs: 57,453 (9.34%)
- Albanians: 40,415 (6.57%)
- Yugoslavs: 26,159 (4.25%)
- Croats: 6,244 (1.02%)
- Roma: 3,282 (0.53%)
- Macedonian: 1,072 (0.17%)
- Slovenes: 369 (0.06%)
- Hungarians: 205 (0.03%)
- Germans: 124 (0.02%)
- Russians: 118 (0.02%)
- Italians: 58 (0.01%)
- Other: 437 (0.07%)
- No response: 1,944 (0.32%)
- Regional affiliation: 998 (0.16%)
- Unknown: 6,076 (0.99%)
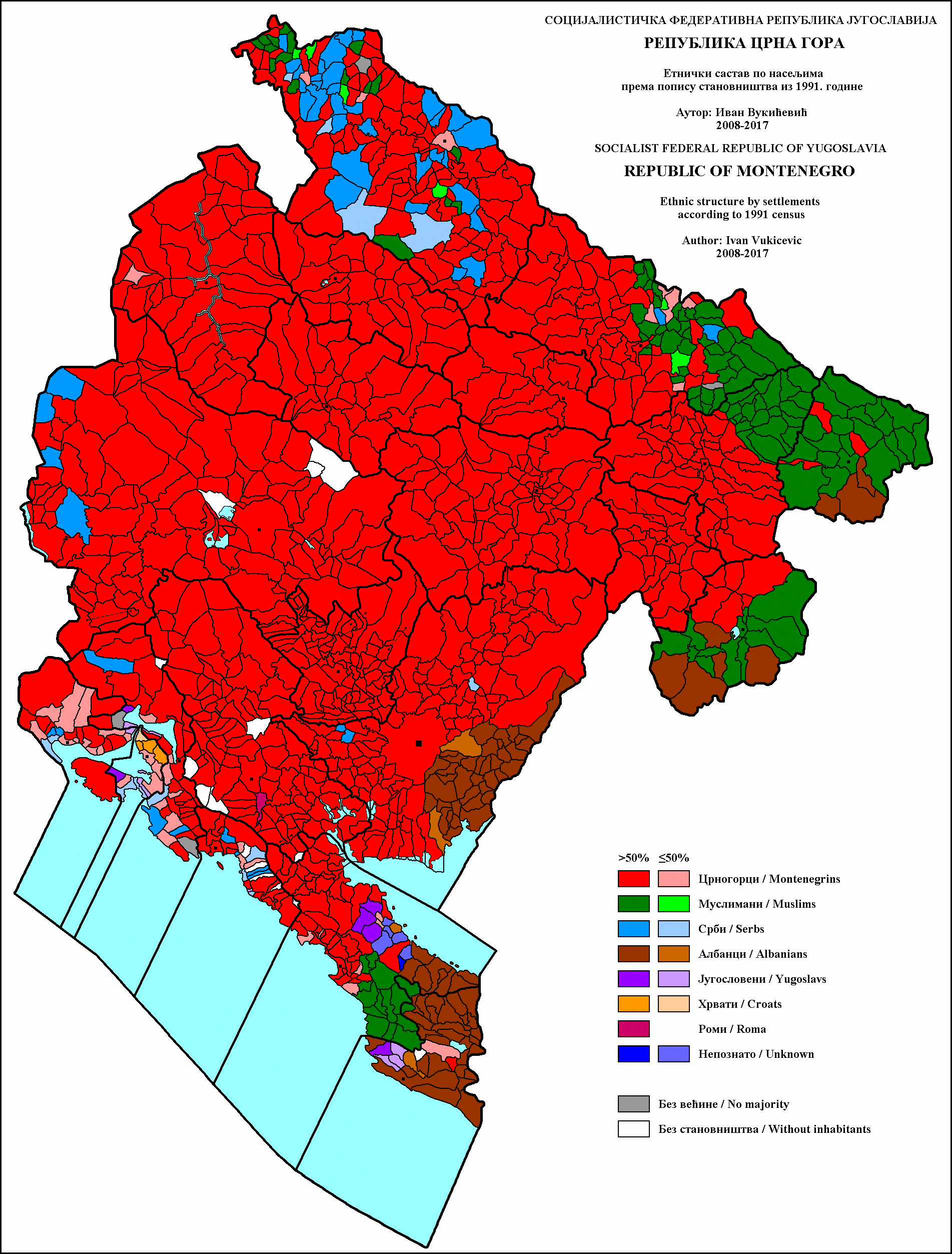
Ethnic structure of Montenegro by settlements 1991

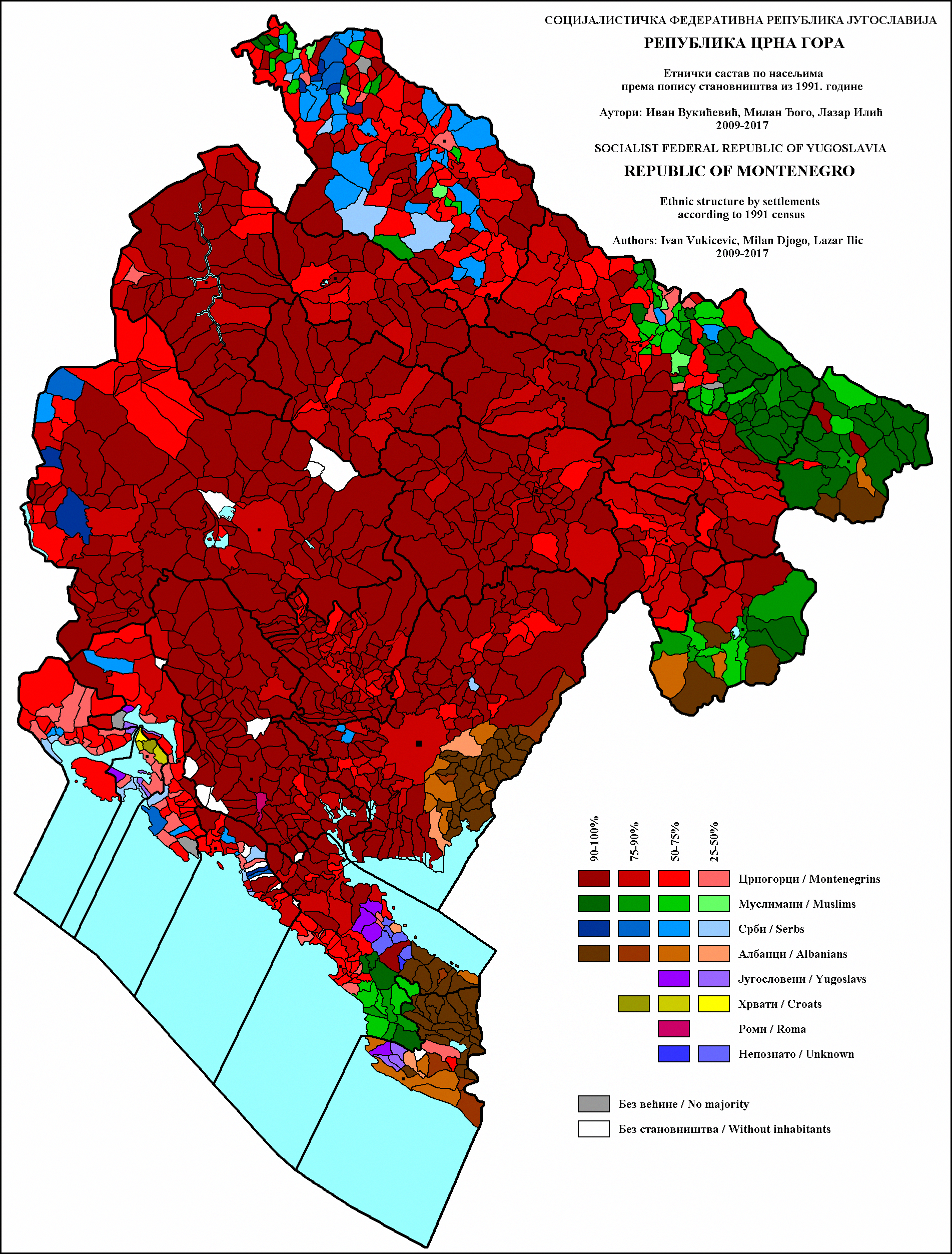
Ethnic structure of Montenegro by settlements 1991

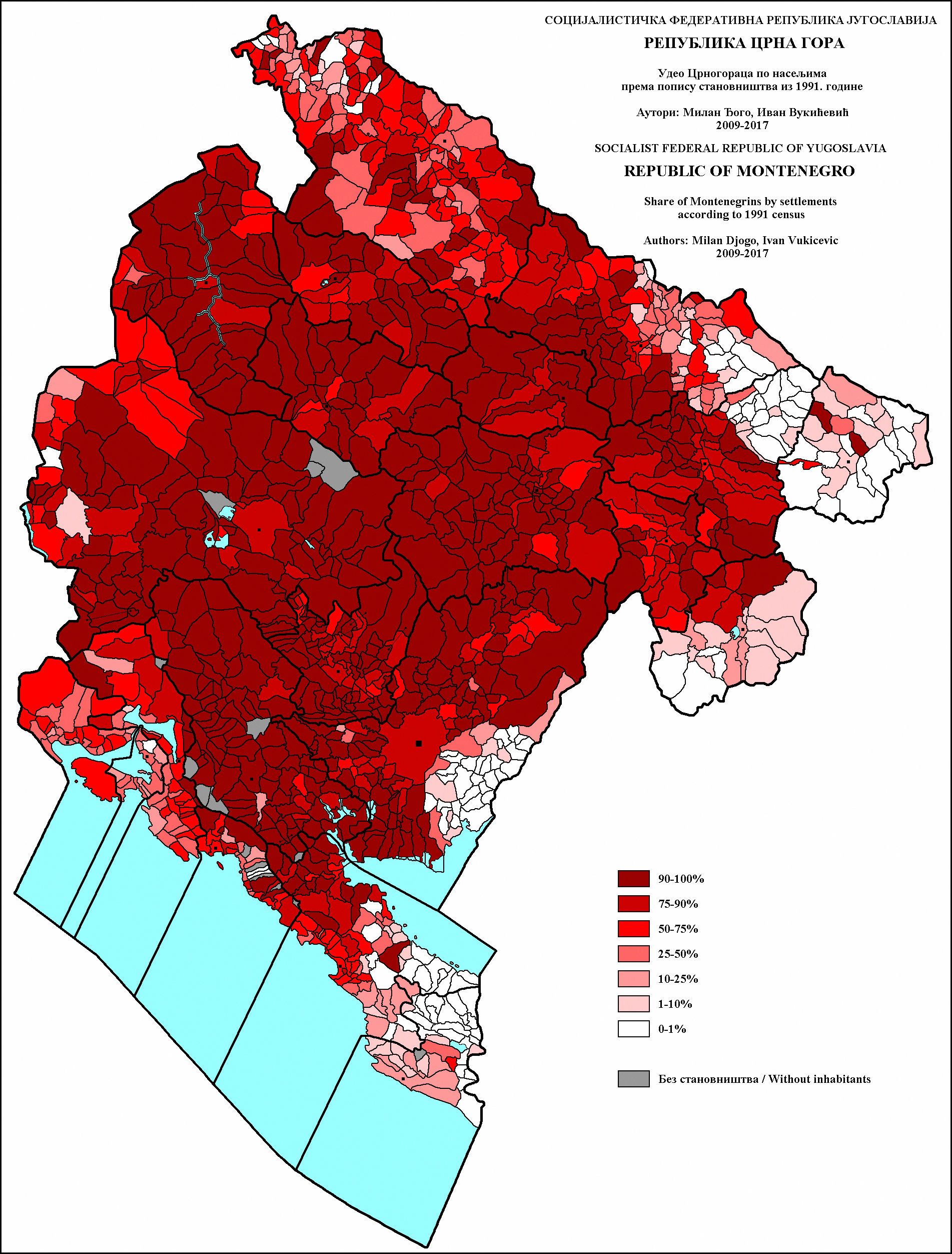
Share of Montenegrins in Montenegro by settlements 1991

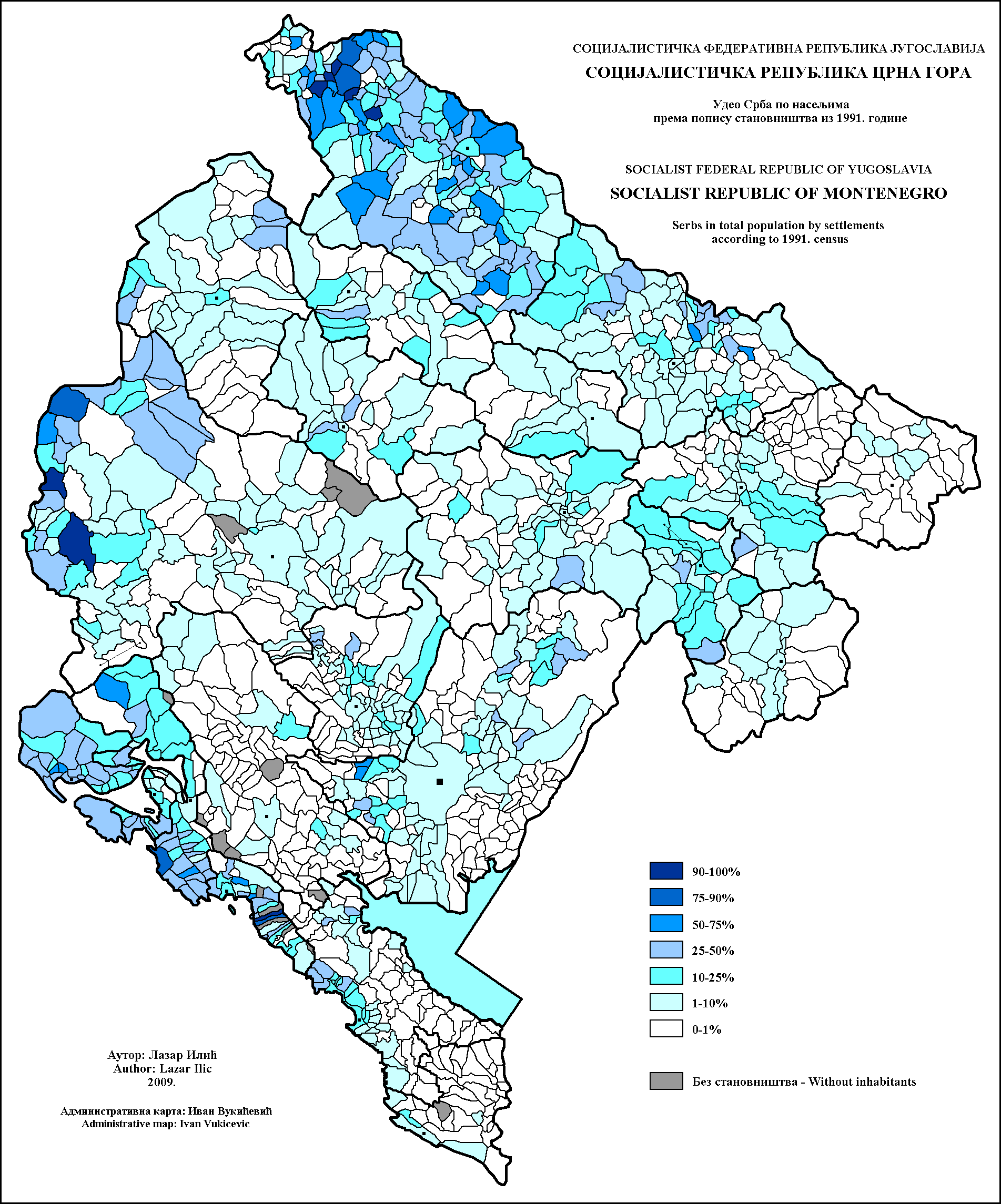
Share of Serbs in Montenegro by settlements 1991

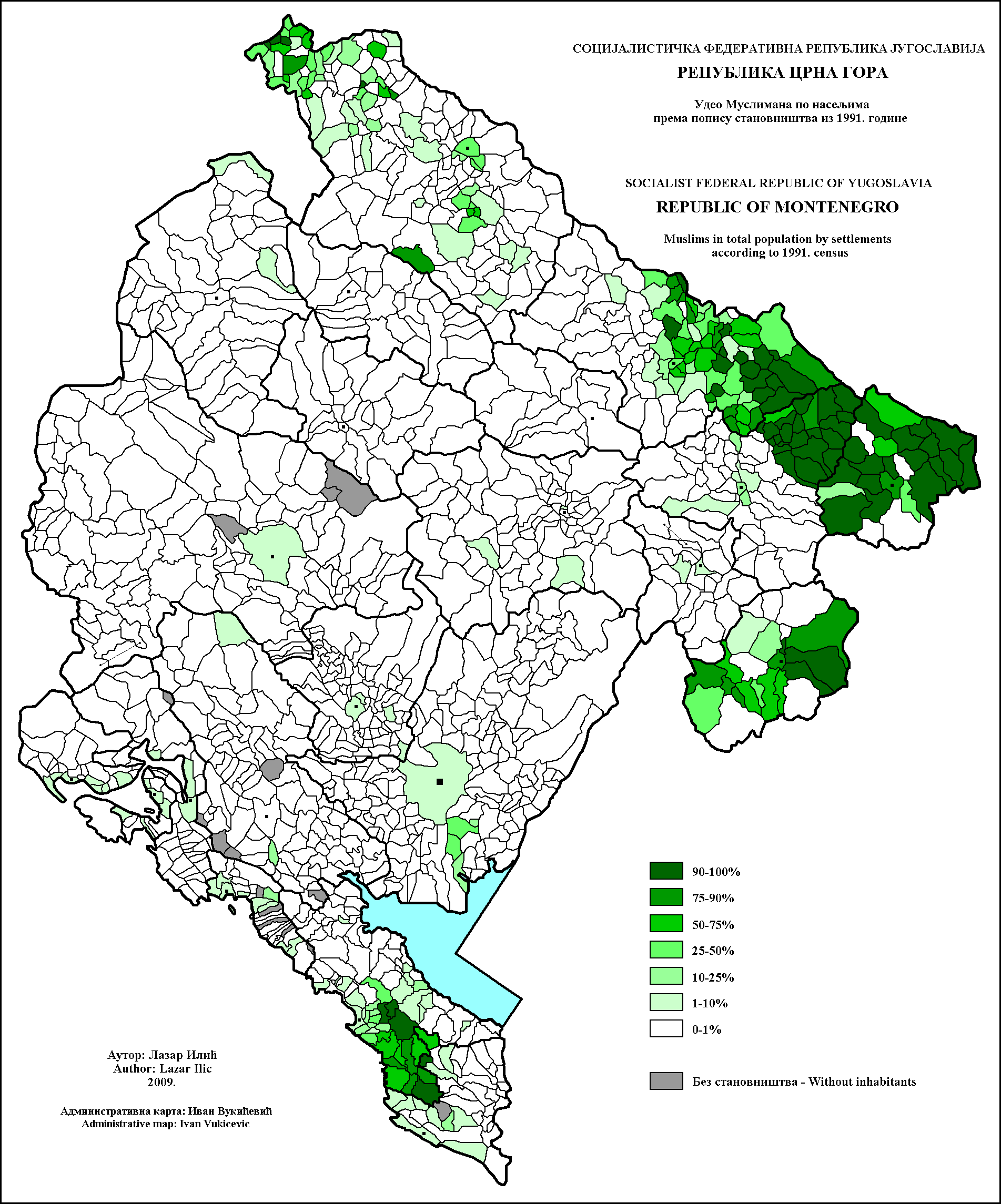
Share of Muslims in Montenegro by settlements 1991

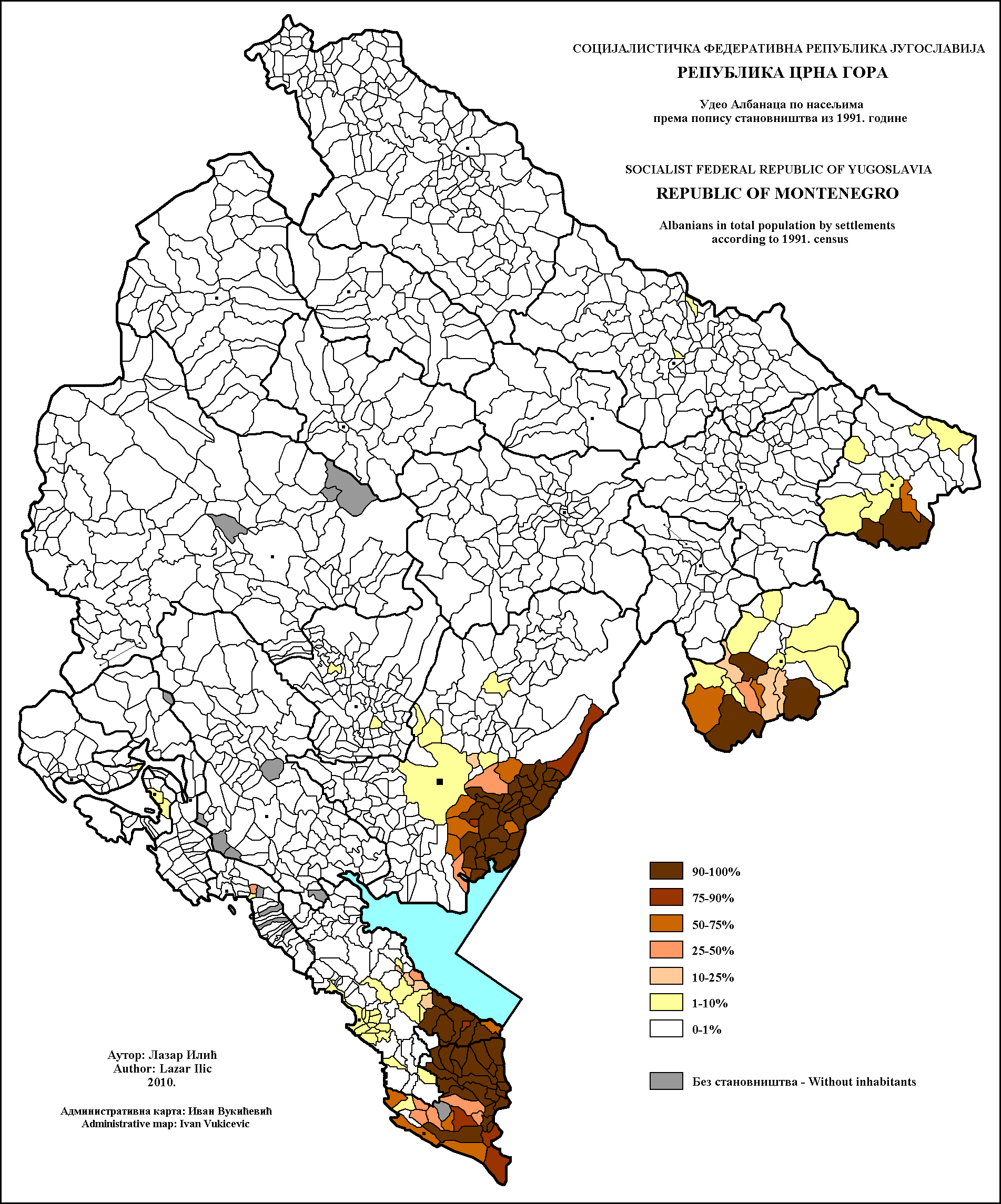
Share of Albanians in Montenegro by settlements 1991

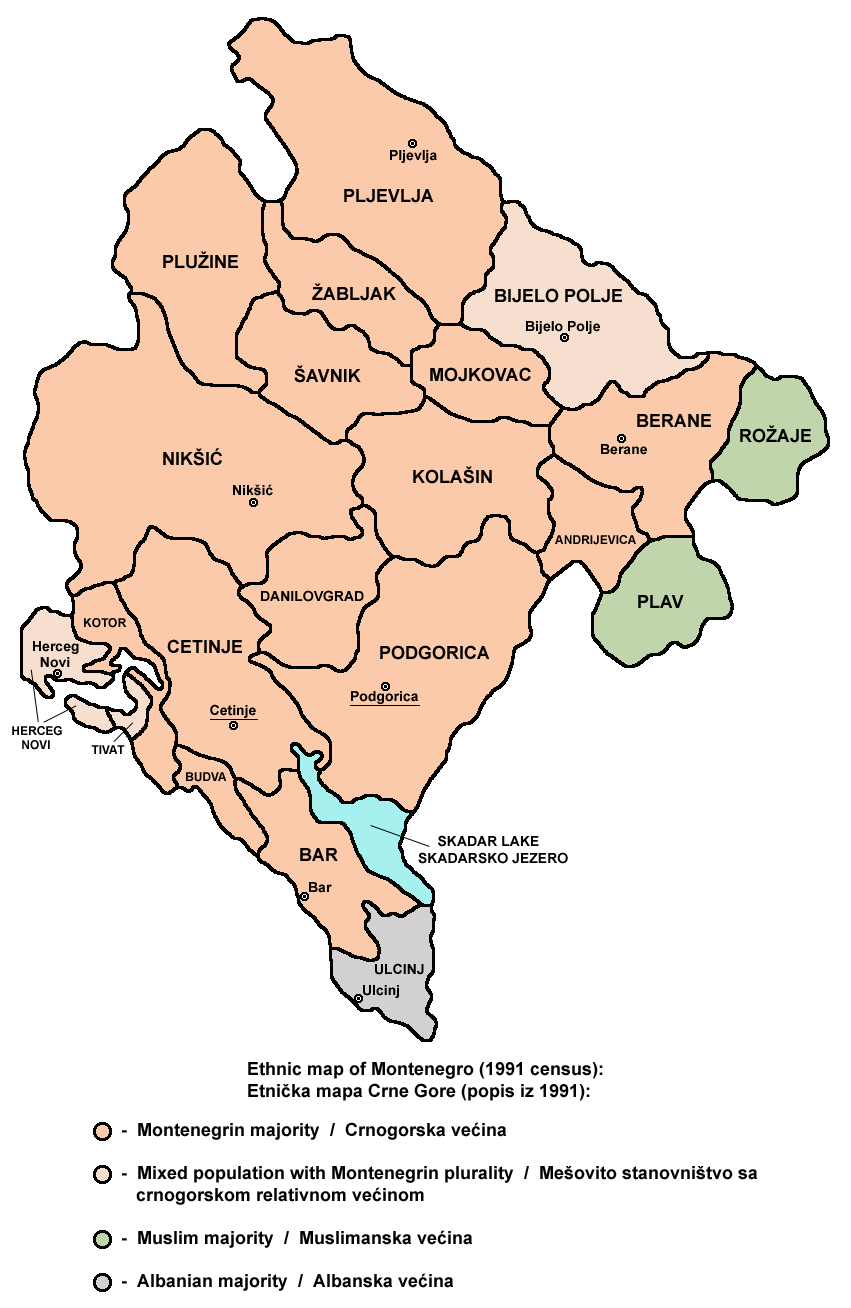
Ethnic structure of Montenegro by municipalities 1991

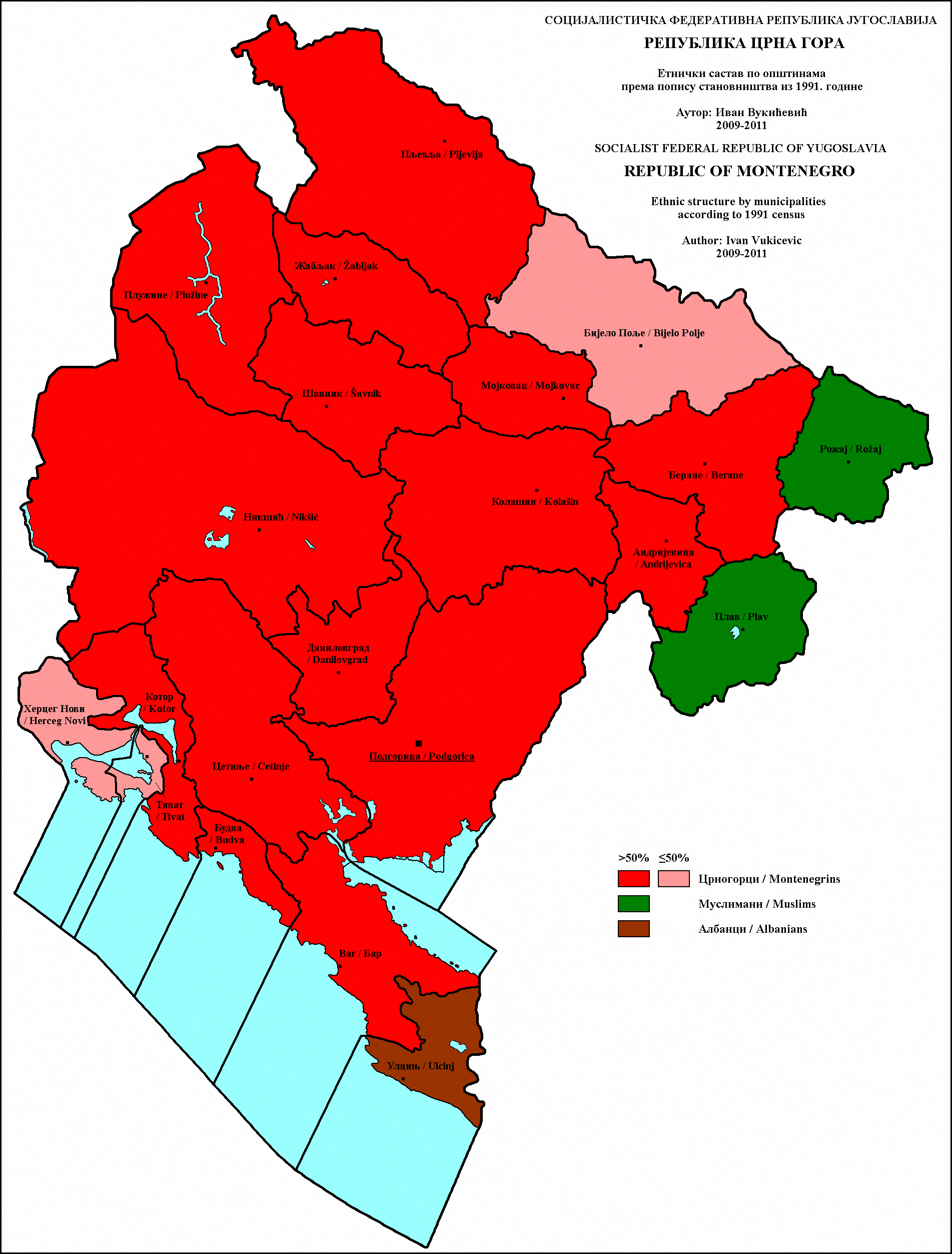
Ethnic structure of Montenegro by municipalities 1991

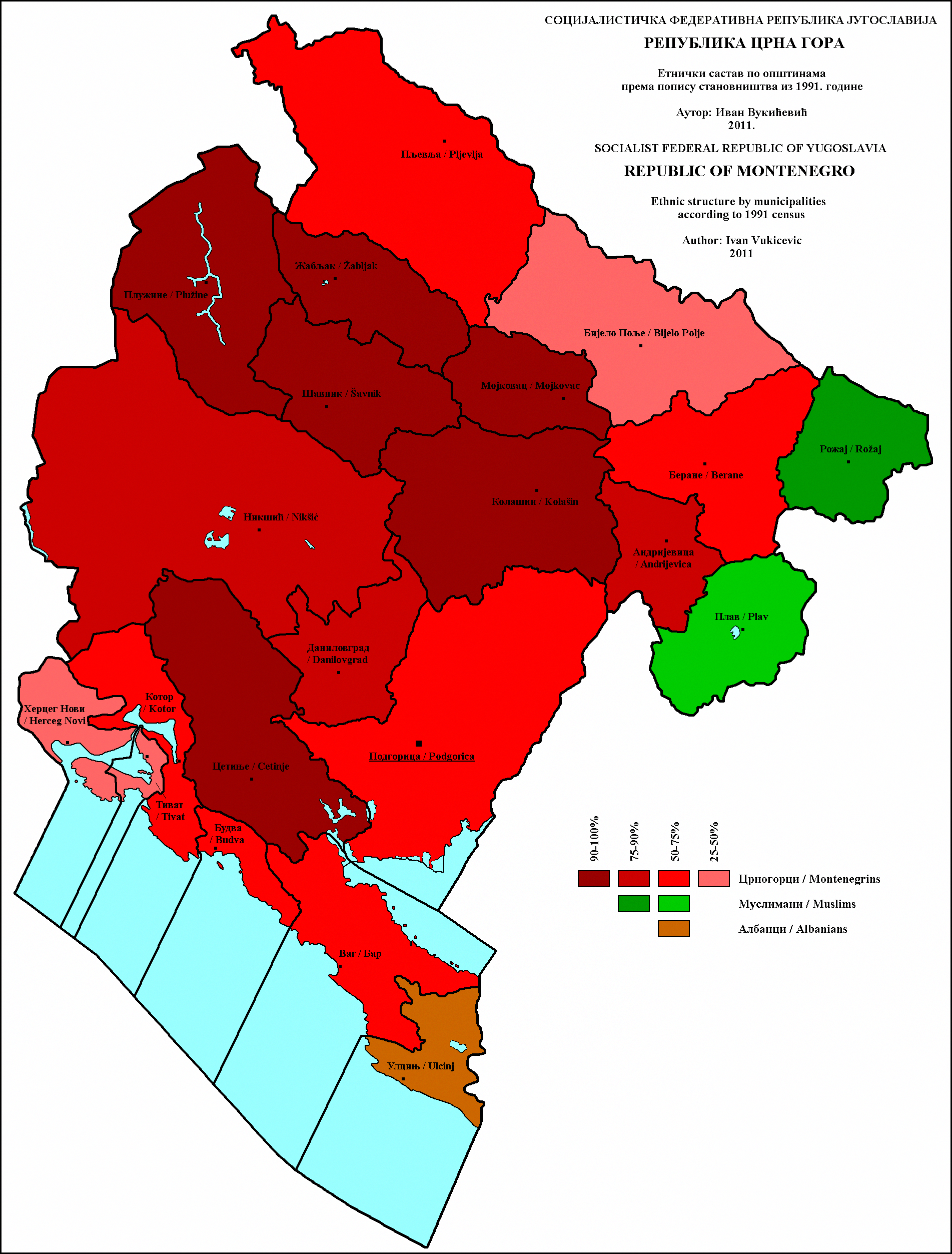
Ethnic structure of Montenegro by municipalities 1991

=== Linguistic structure ===
- Serbian: 510,320
- Montenegrin: 144,838
- Albanian: 43,907 (7.15%)
- 40,008 Muslims declared their language to be Serbian, while most declared either Bosniak or Bosnian languages as their mother tongue

=== Religious structure ===
- Eastern Orthodox - 425,133
  - Montenegrins - 241,728
  - Serbs - 196,333
- Muslims - 118,016
  - Albanians - 26,216
  - Montenegrins - 82,492
  - Yugoslavs - 1,856
- Catholic - 27,153
  - Albanians - 12,772
  - Yugoslavs - 4,149
  - Montenegrins - 3,081
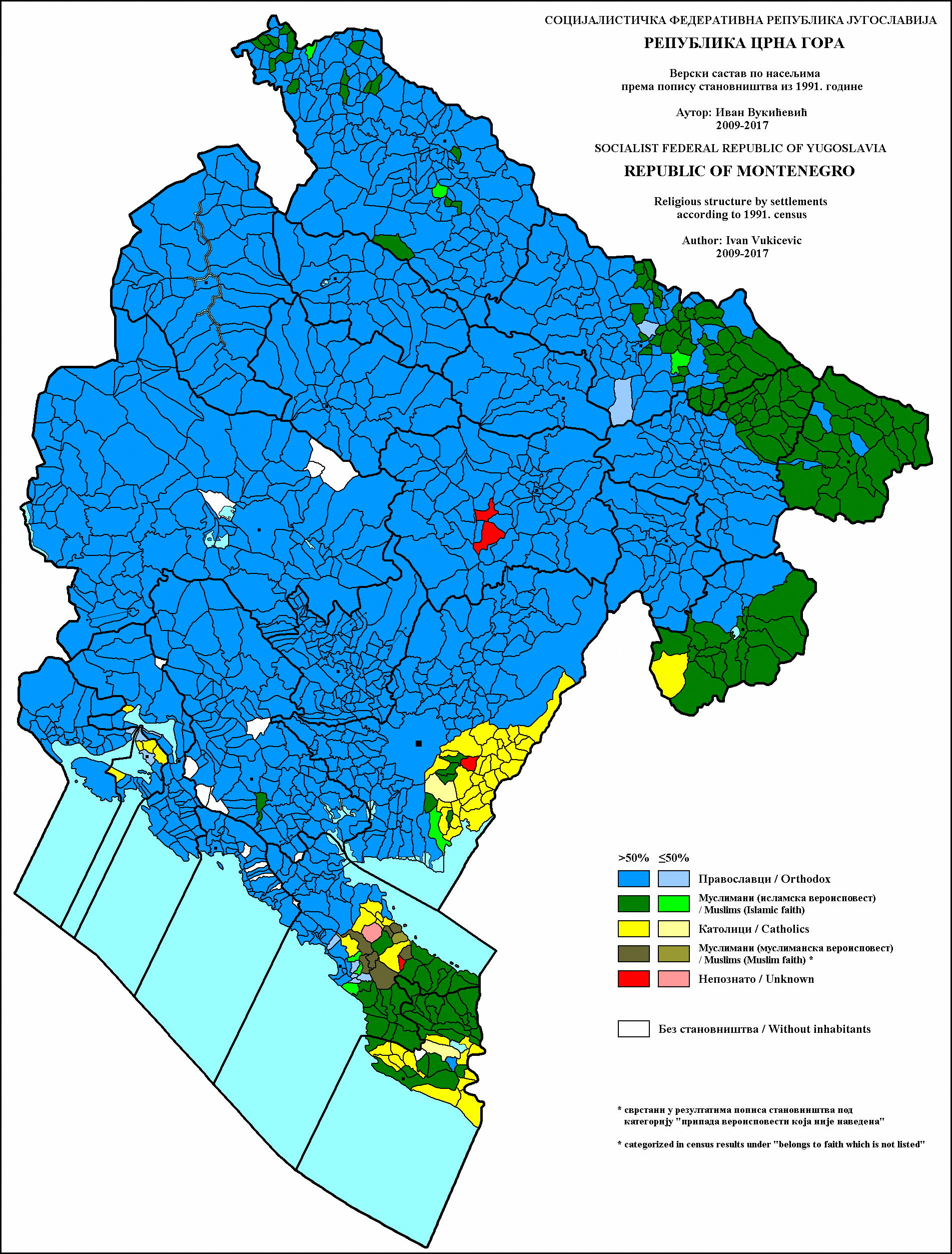
Religious structure of Montenegro by settlements 1991

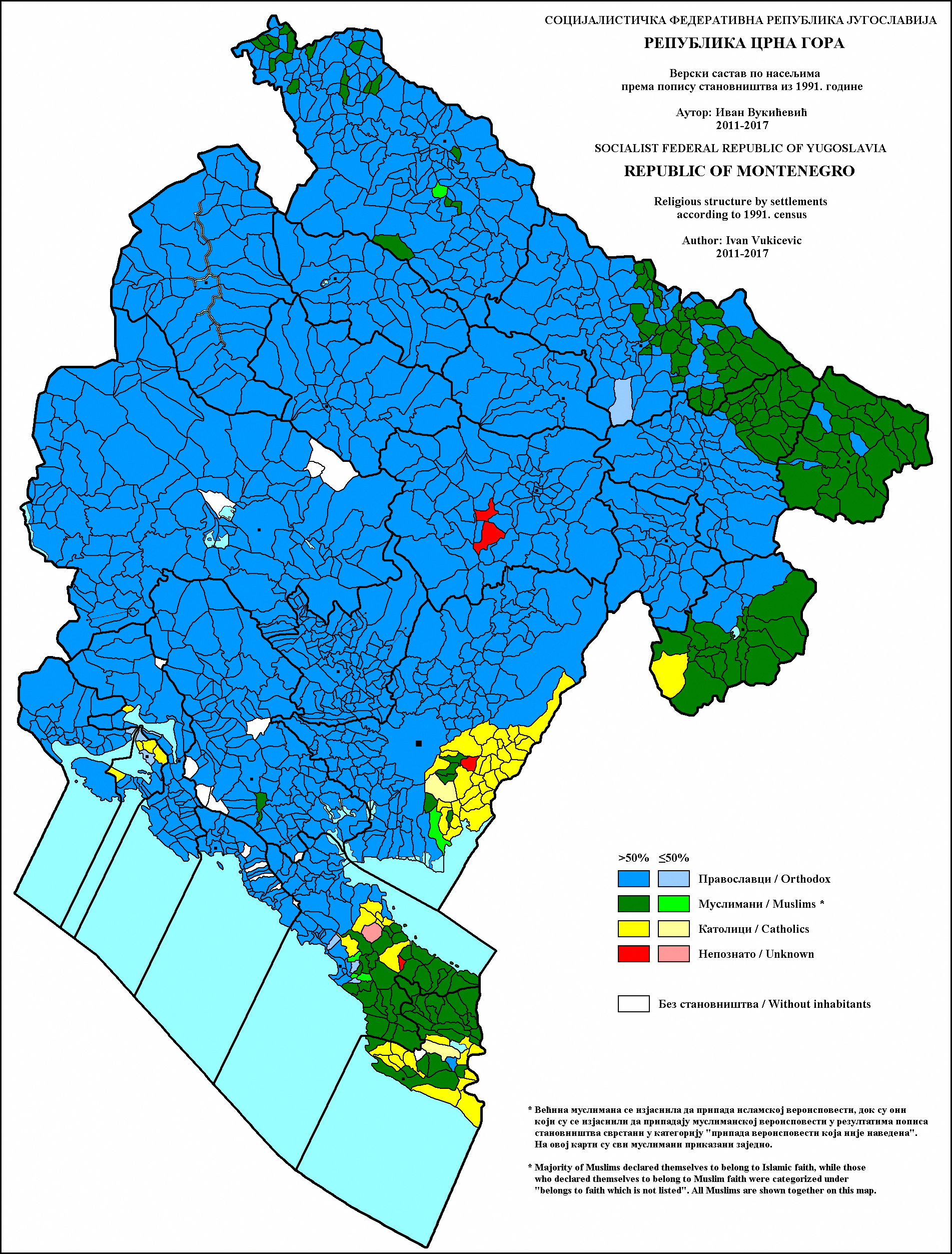
Religious structure of Montenegro by settlements 1991

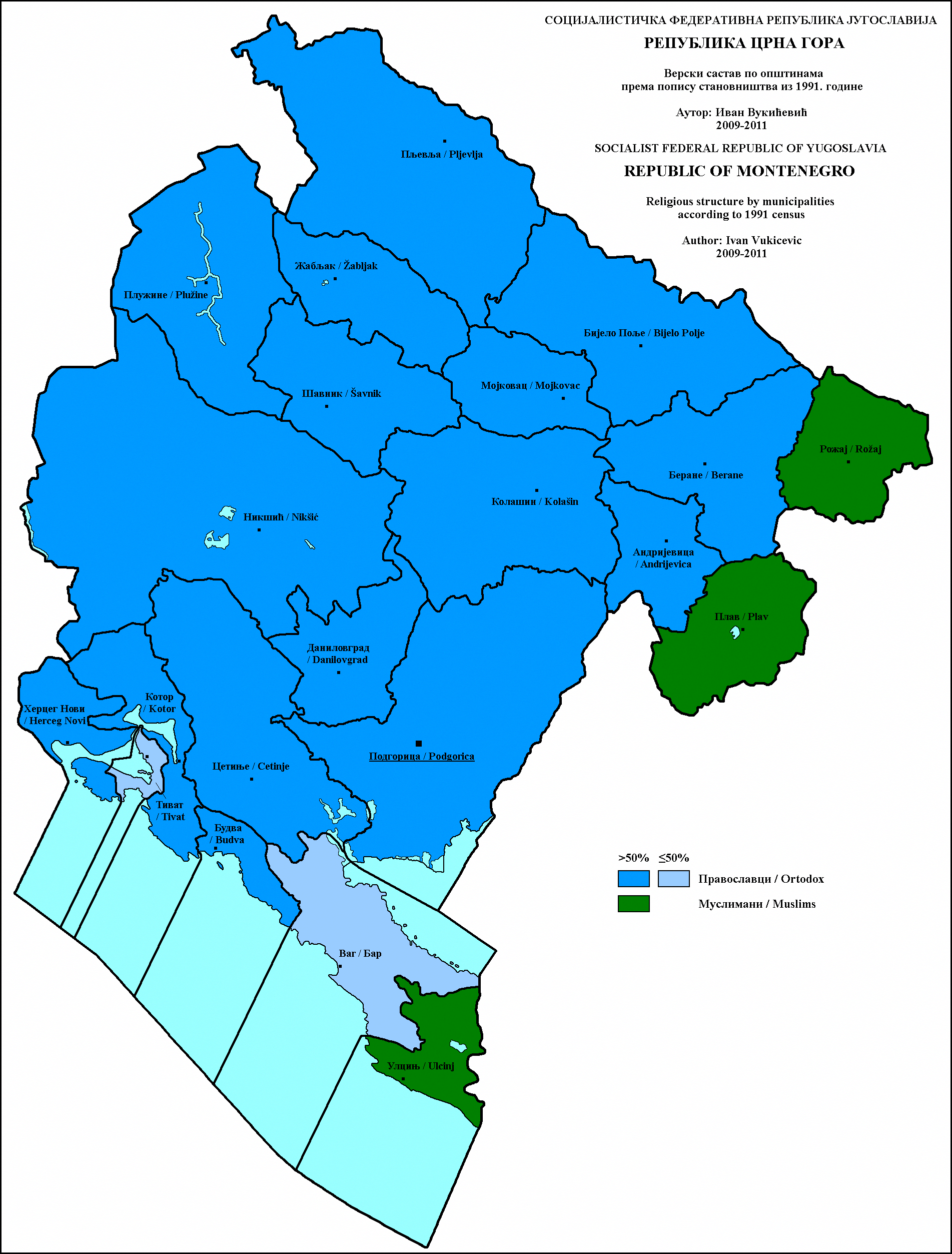
Religious structure of Montenegro by municipalities 1991

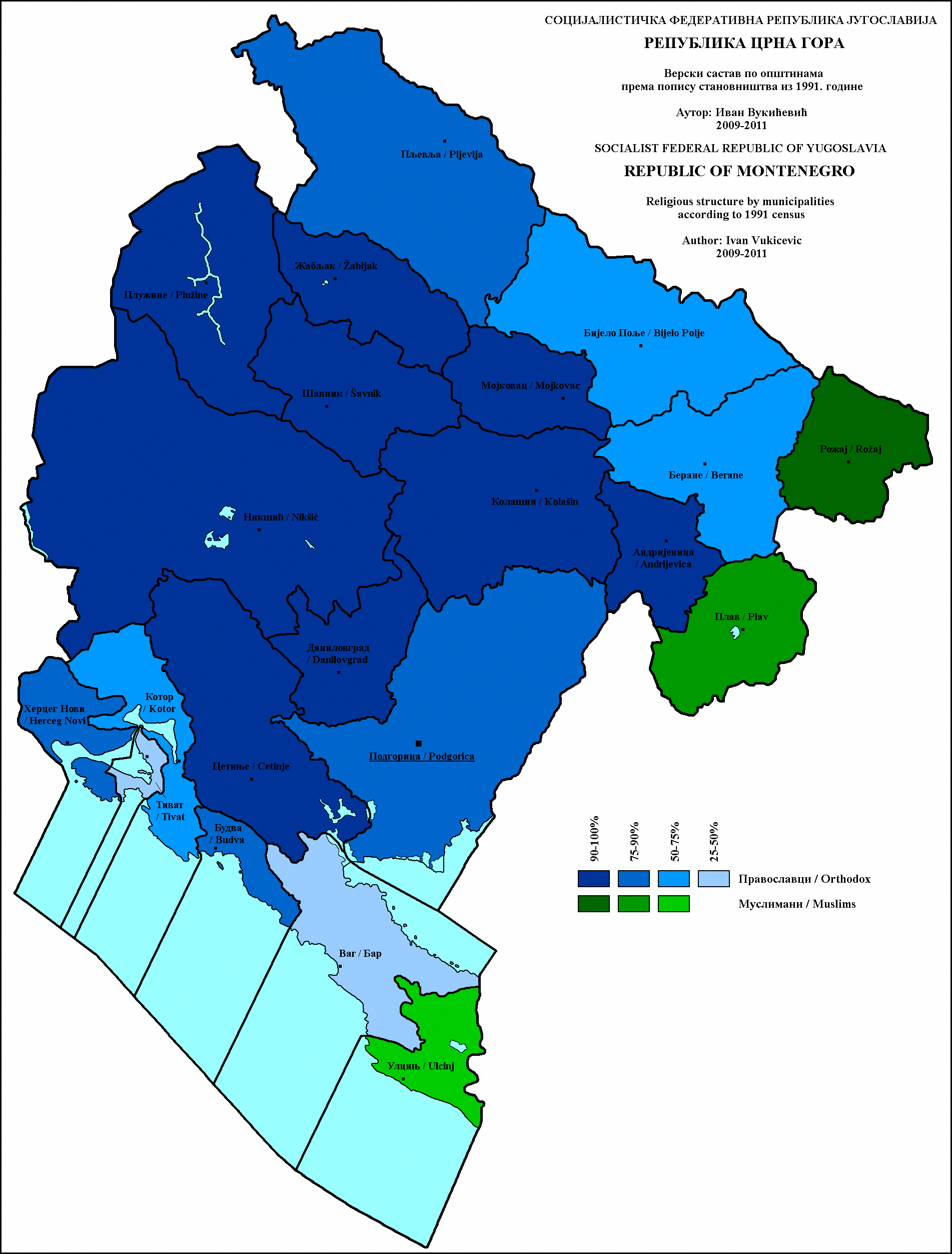
Religious structure of Montenegro by municipalities 1991

== 2003 ==
The 2003 census was undertaken by authorities in Montenegro, which at this time, together with Serbia, constituted Serbia and Montenegro.

Total: 620,145

=== Ethnic structure ===
- Montenegrins 267,669 (43.16%)
- Serbs 198,414 (31.99%)
- Bosniaks 48,184 (7.77%)
- Albanians 31,163 (5.03%)
- ethnic Muslims 24,625 (3.97%)
- Croats 6,811 (1.1%)
- Roma 2,601 (0.42%)
- Yugoslavs 1,860 (0.3%)
- Macedonians 819 (0.13%)
- Slovenes 415 (0.07%)
- Hungarians 362 (0.06%)
- Russians 240 (0.04%)
- Egyptians 225 (0.04%)
- Italians 127 (0.02%)
- Germans 118 (0.02%)
- Others (i.e. Greeks, Turks, Romanians, Bulgarians) 2,180 (0.35%)
- No response 26,906 (4.34%)
- Regional affiliation 1,258 (0.2%)
- Unknown 6,168 (0.99%)

This census witnessed the forming of the Bosniak nation, but some people still thought of themselves ethnic Muslims, however. Also, there are very few people left who consider themselves Yugoslavs. But the biggest difference compared to the 1991 census is the dramatic increase in self-identification of many inhabitants as Serbs, which was not the case in Socialist Yugoslavia.

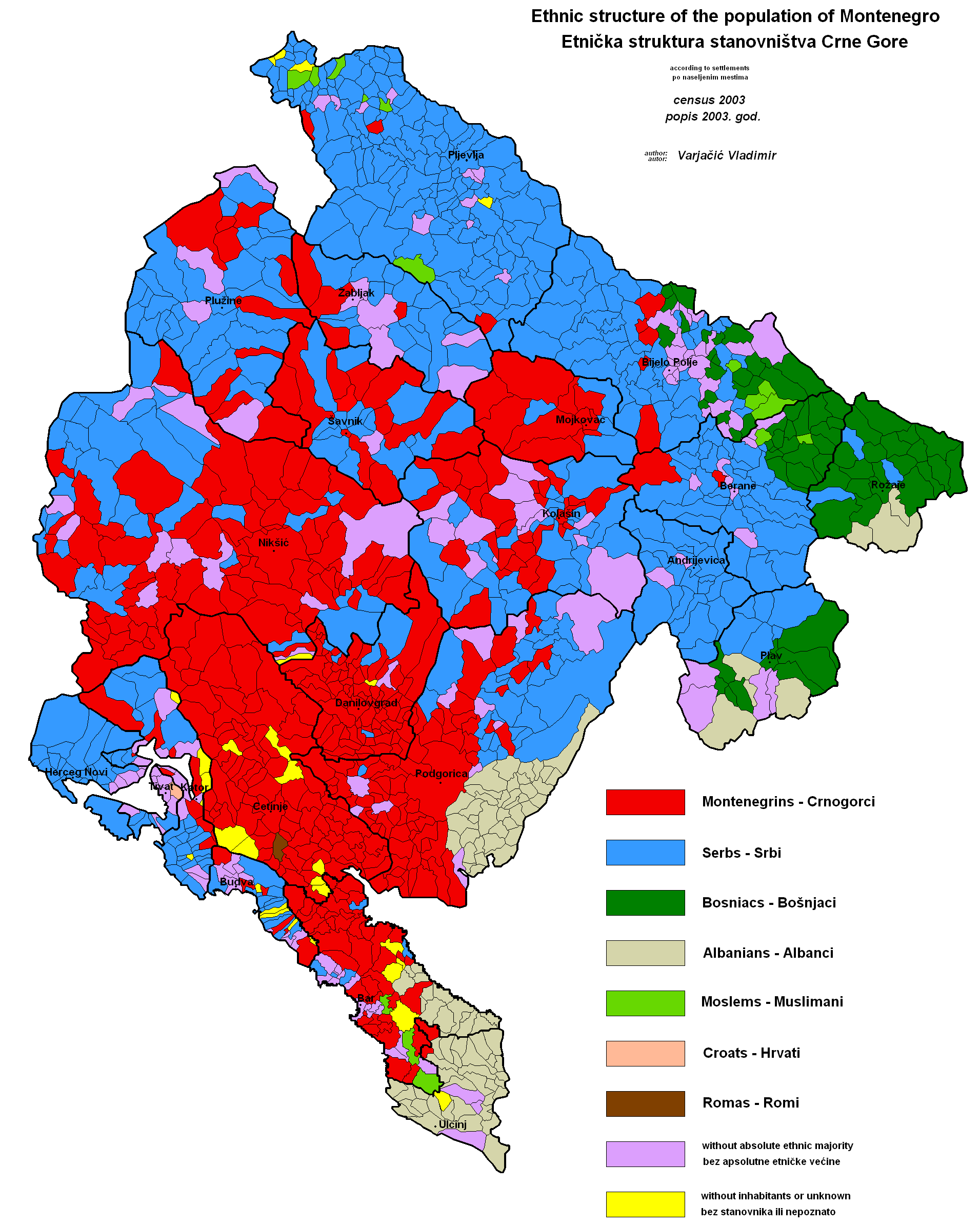
Ethnic structure of Montenegro by settlements 2003

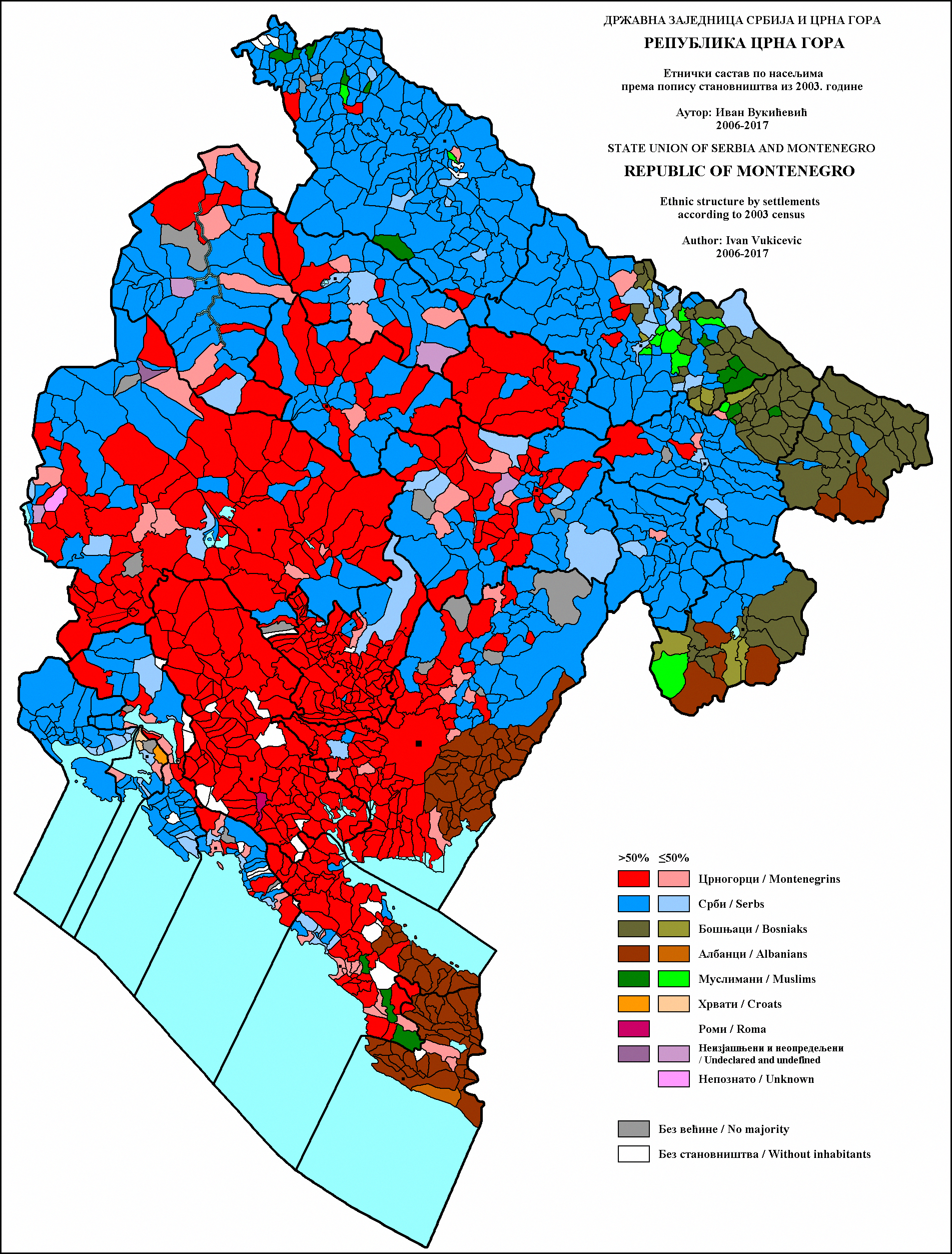
Ethnic structure of Montenegro by settlements 2003

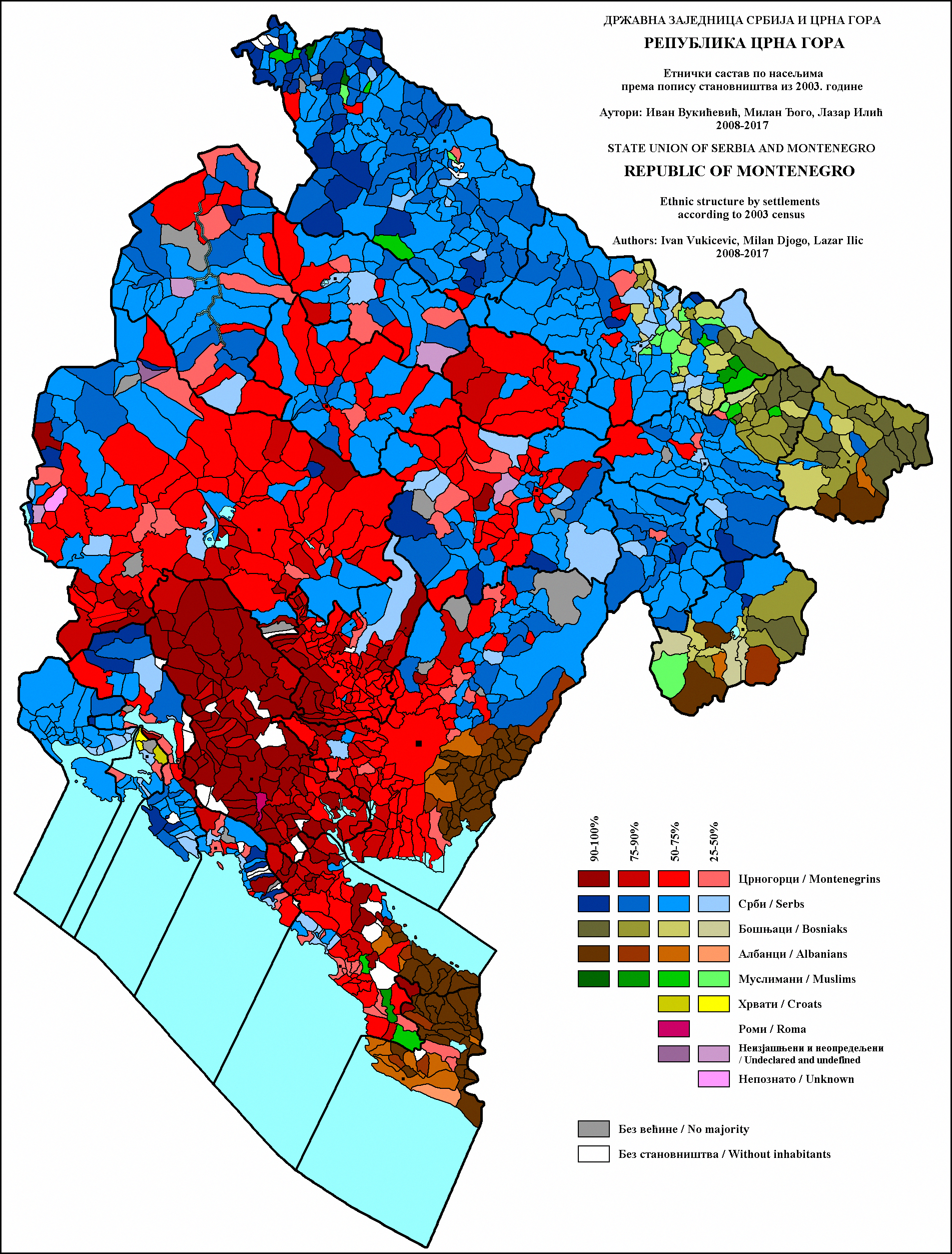
Ethnic structure of Montenegro by settlements 2003

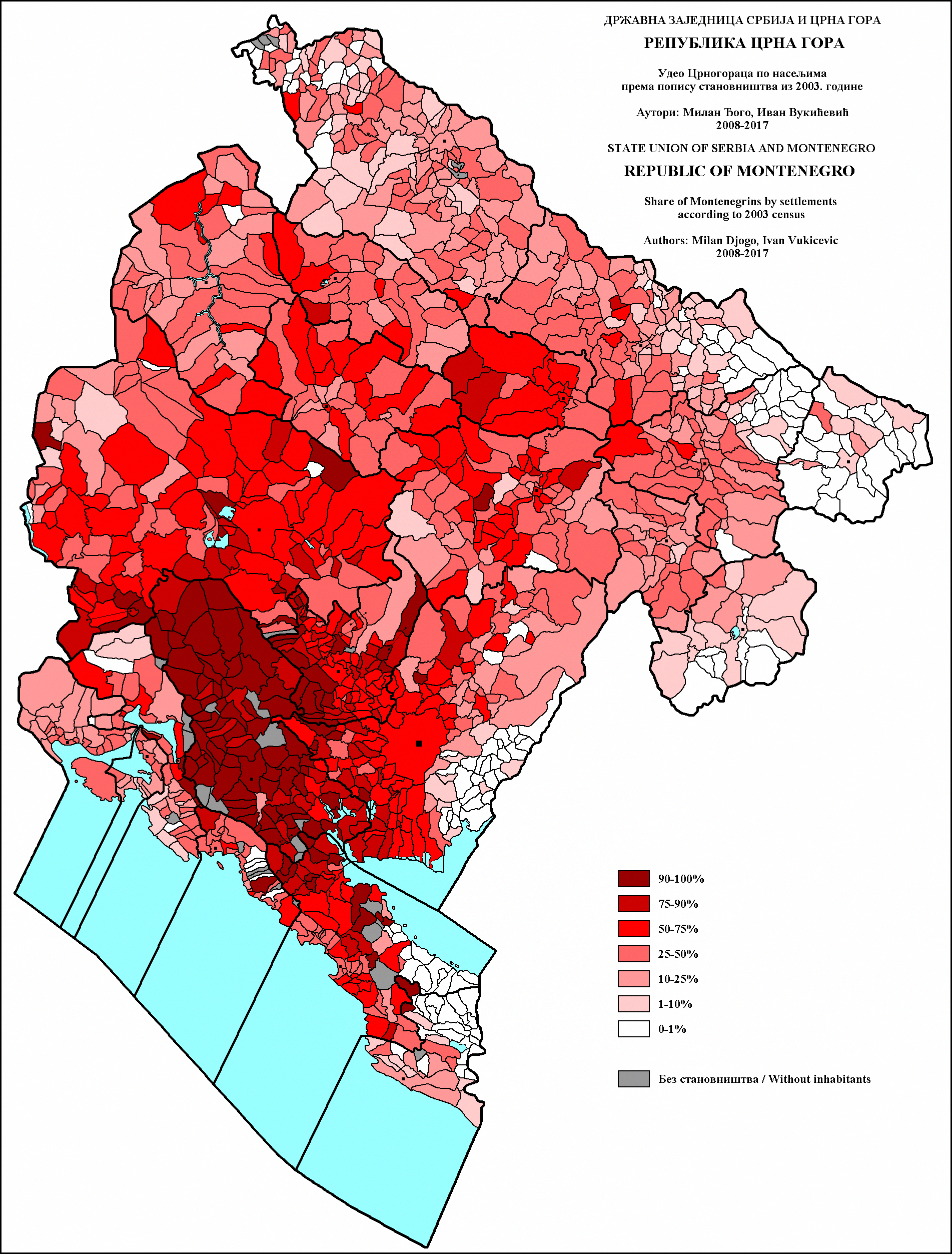
Share of Montenegrins in Montenegro by settlements 2003

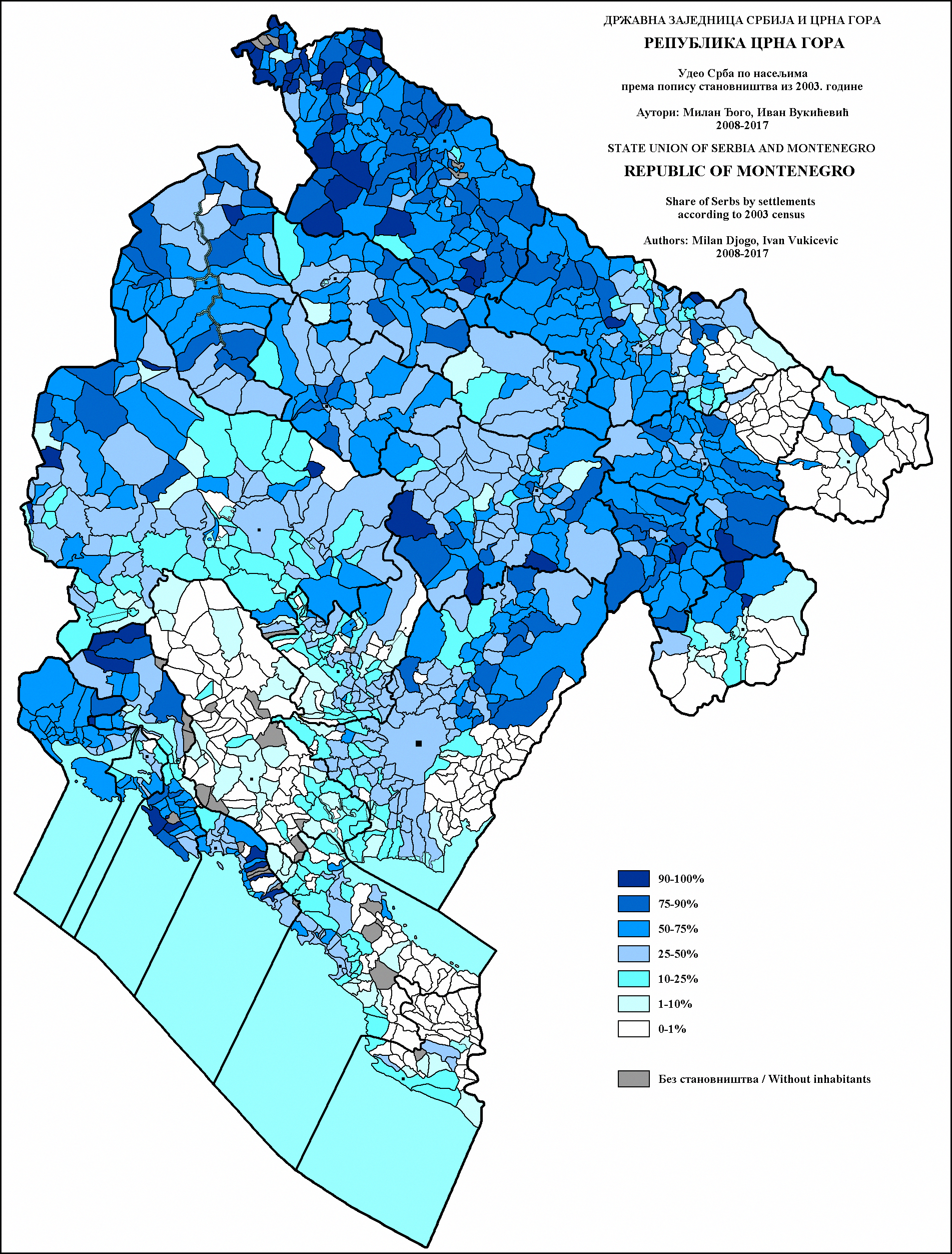
Share of Serbs in Montenegro by settlements 2003

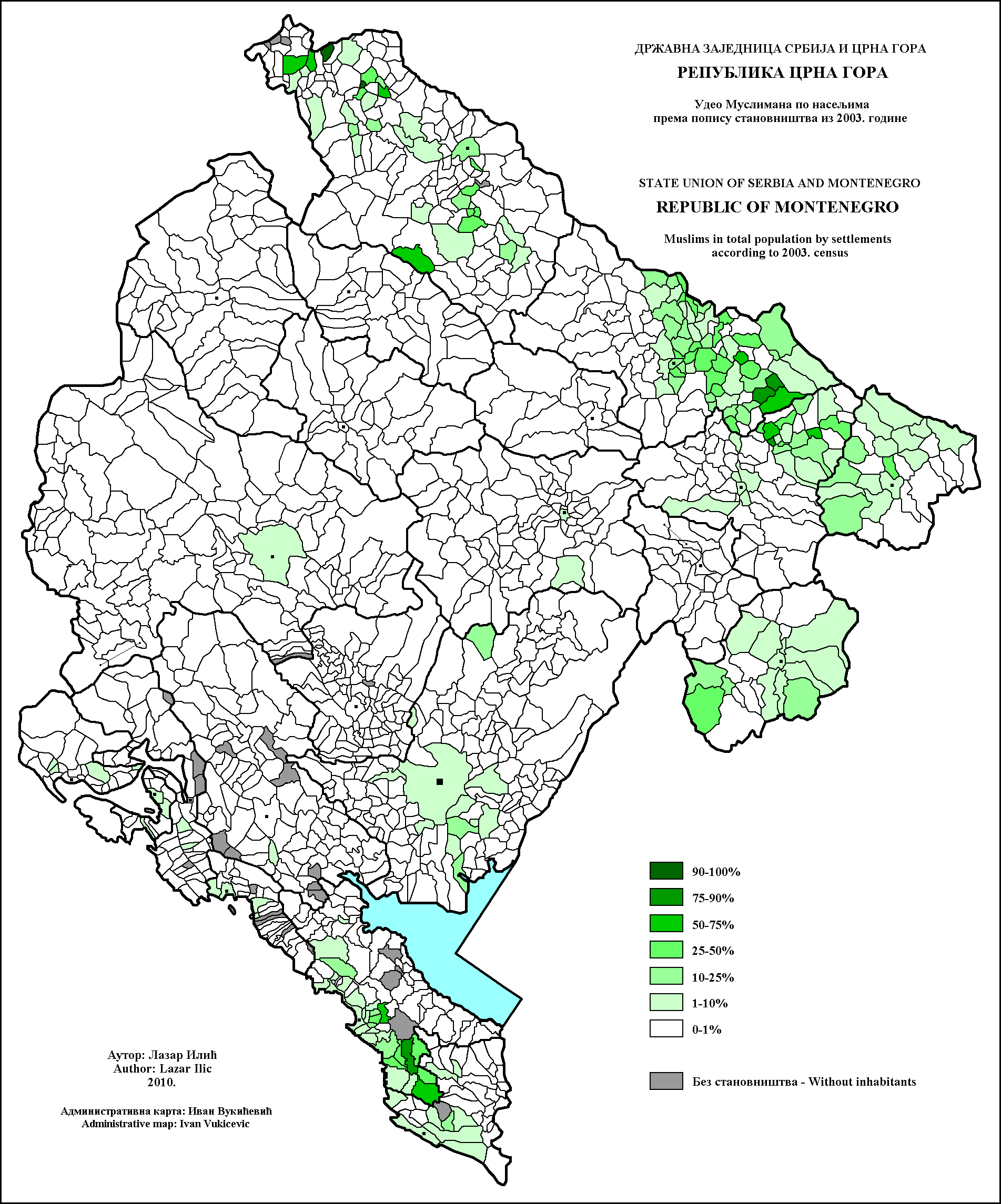
Share of Muslims in Montenegro by settlements 2003

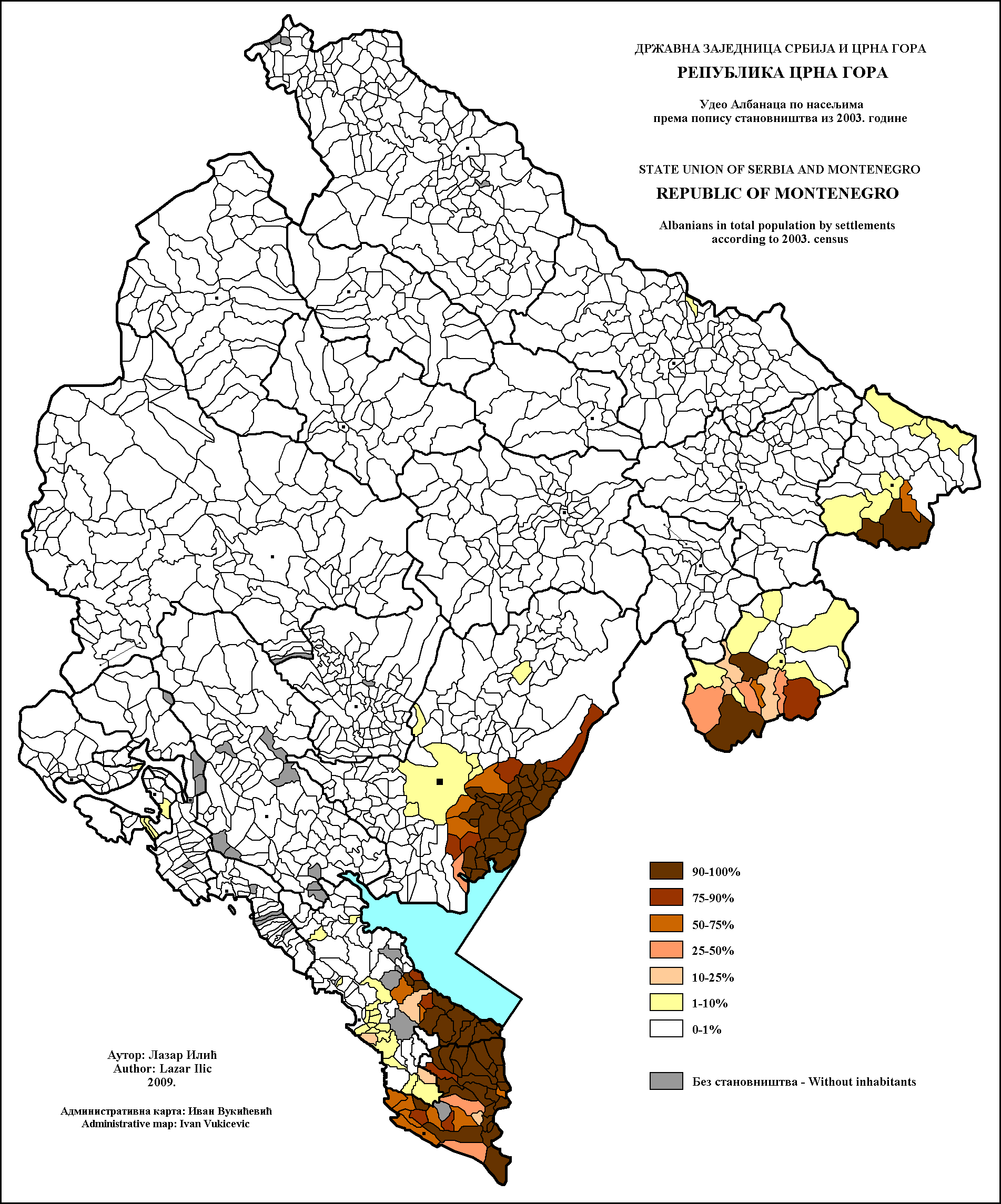
Share of Albanians in Montenegro by settlements 2003

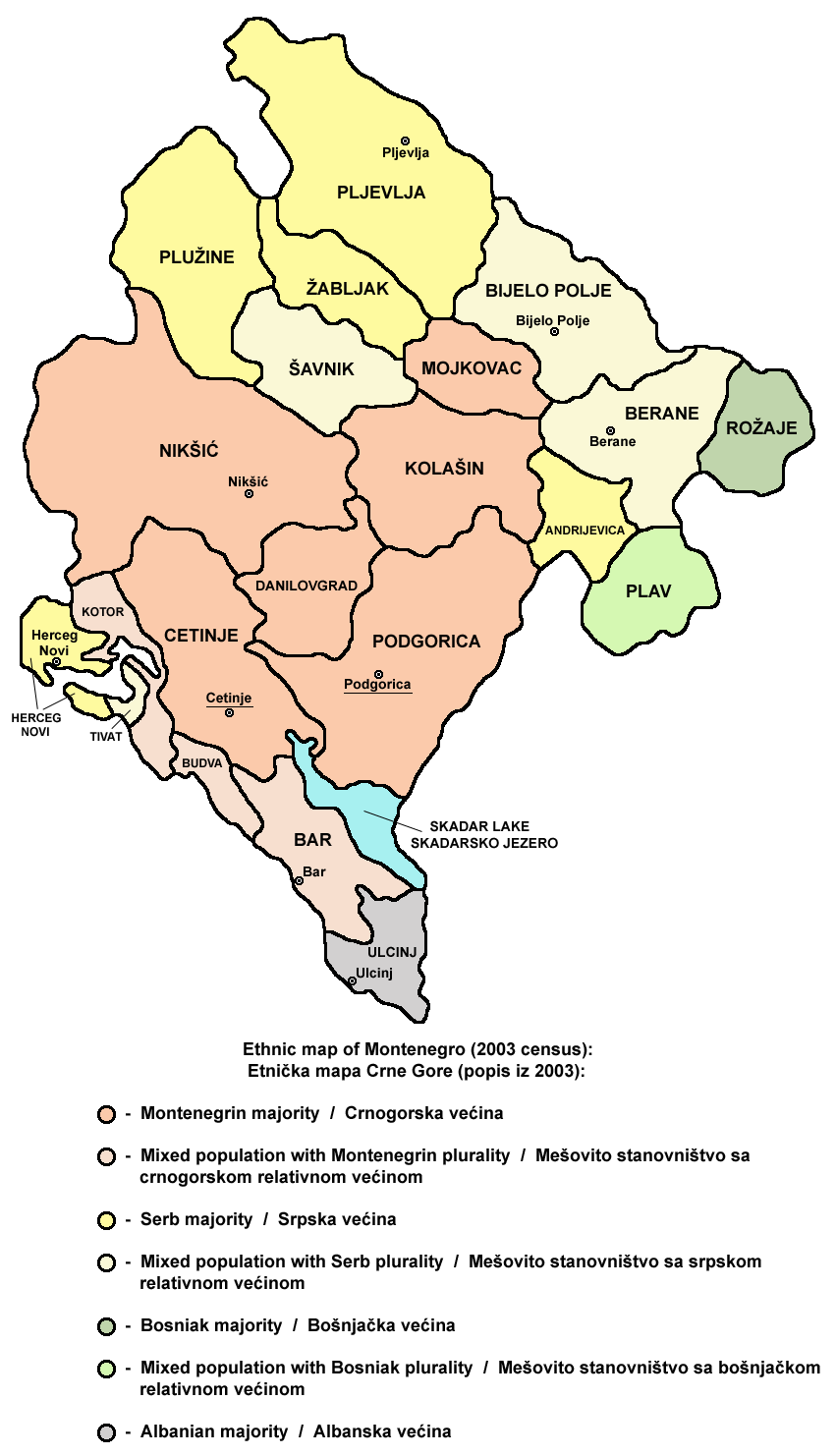
Ethnic structure of Montenegro by municipalities 2003

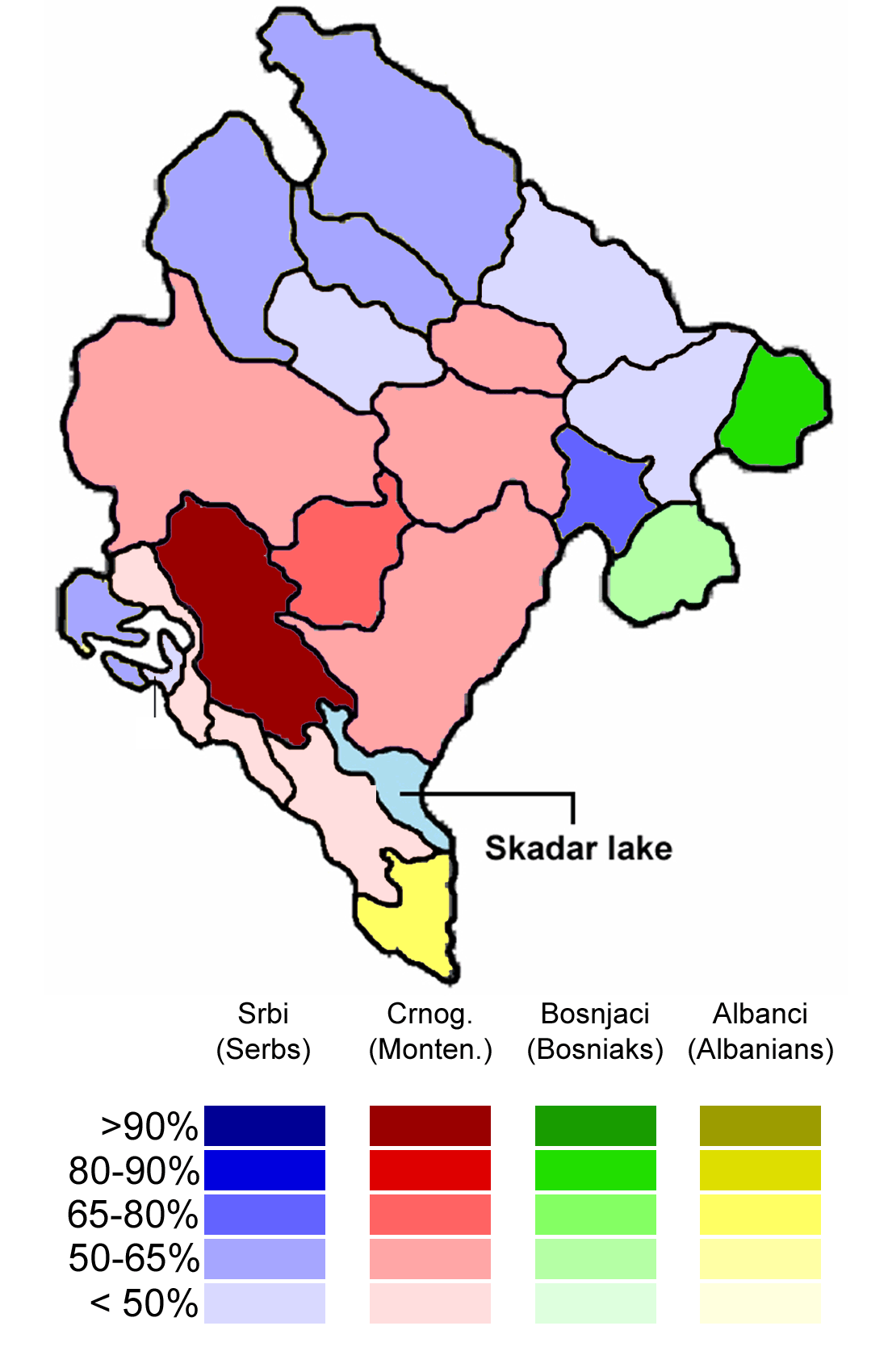
Ethnic structure of Montenegro by municipalities 2003

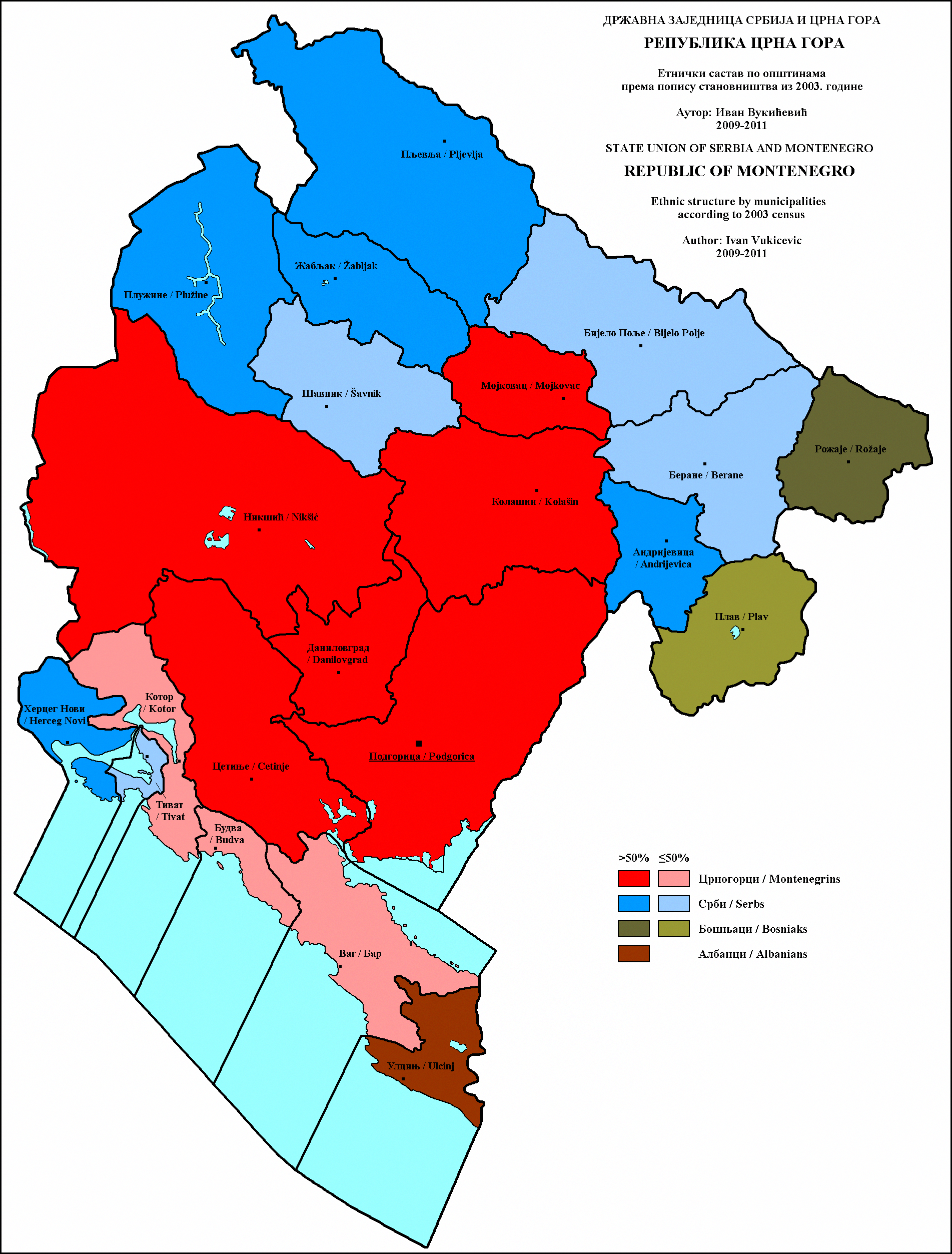
Ethnic structure of Montenegro by municipalities 2003

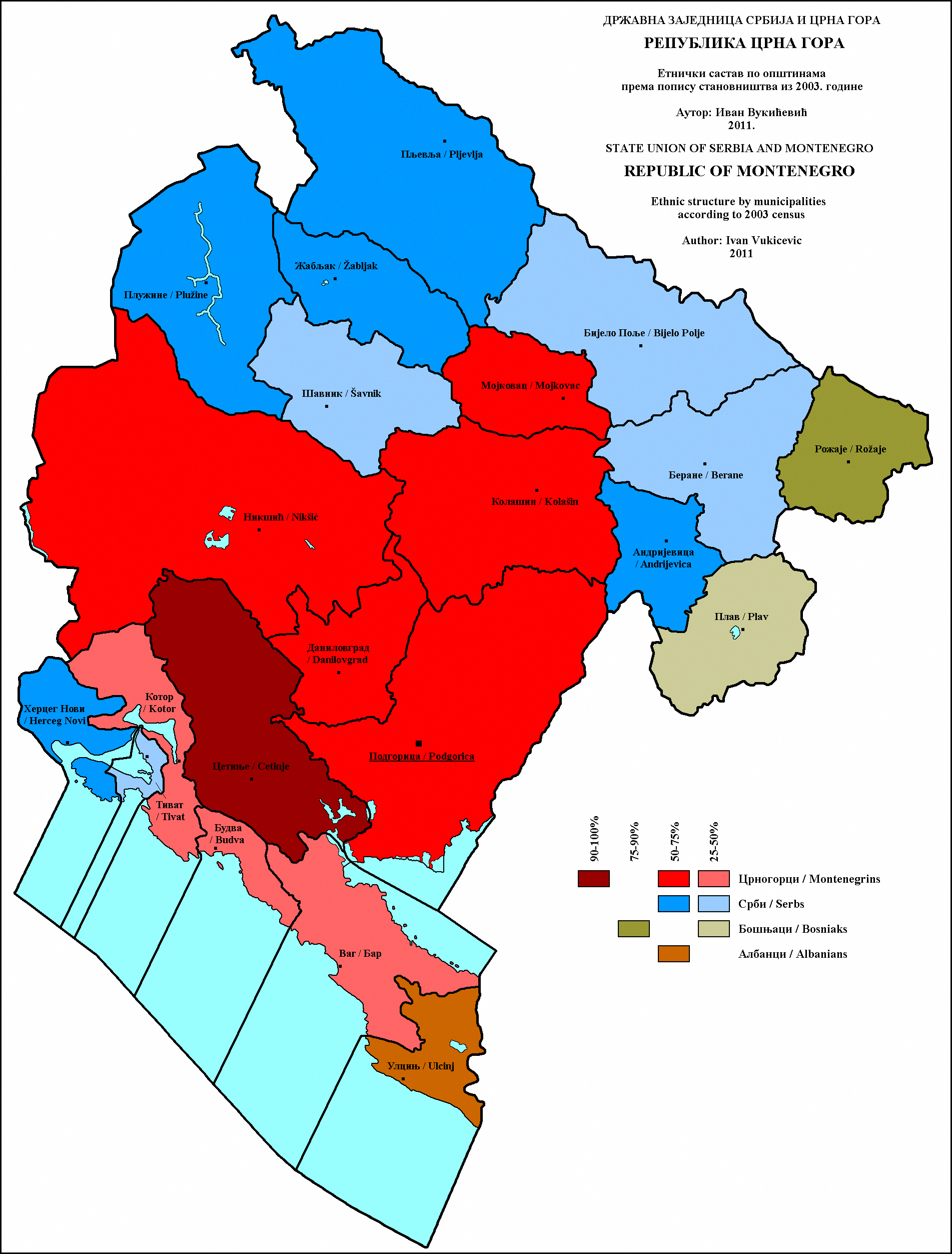
Ethnic structure of Montenegro by municipalities 2003

=== Linguistic structure ===
- Serbian - 393.740 (63,49%)
- Montenegrin: 136.208 (21,96%)
- Albanian - 32.603 (5,26%)
- Bosniak - 19.906 (3,21%)
- Bosnian - 14.172 (2,29%)
- Croatian - 2.791 (0,45%)
- Roma - 2.602 (0,42%)
- undeclared: 13.902 (2,24%)
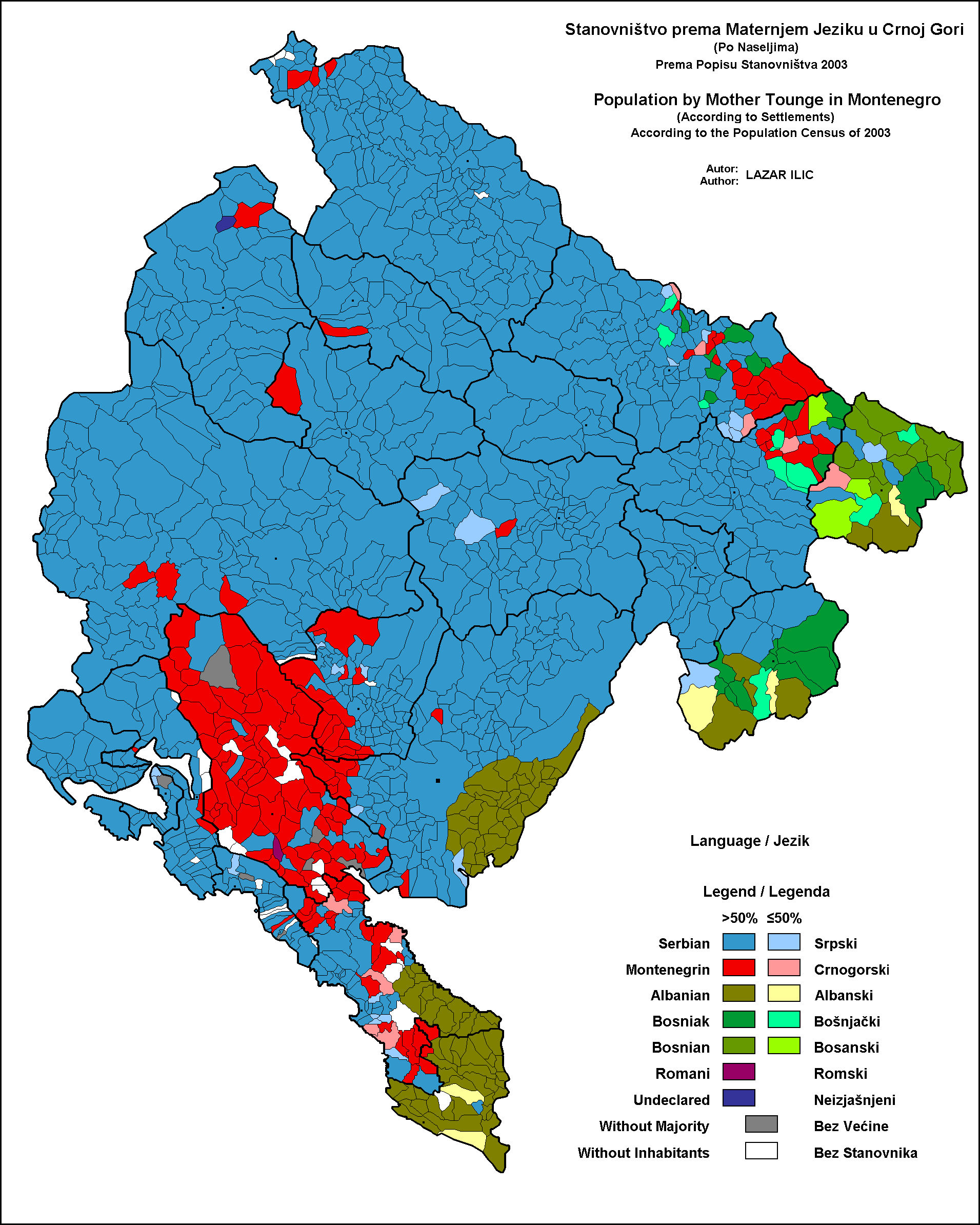
Linguistic structure of Montenegro by municipalities 2003

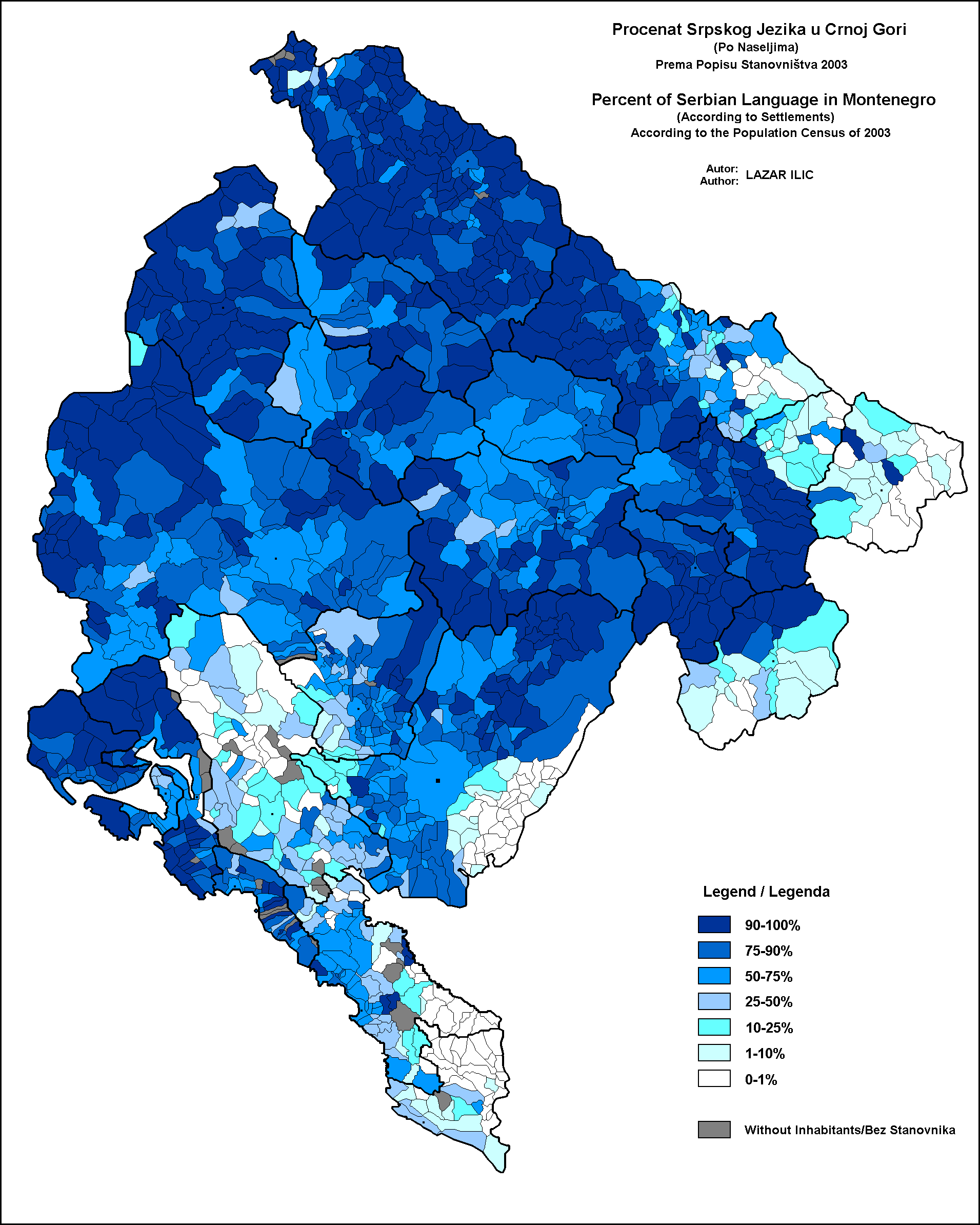
Serbian language in Montenegro by municipalities 2003

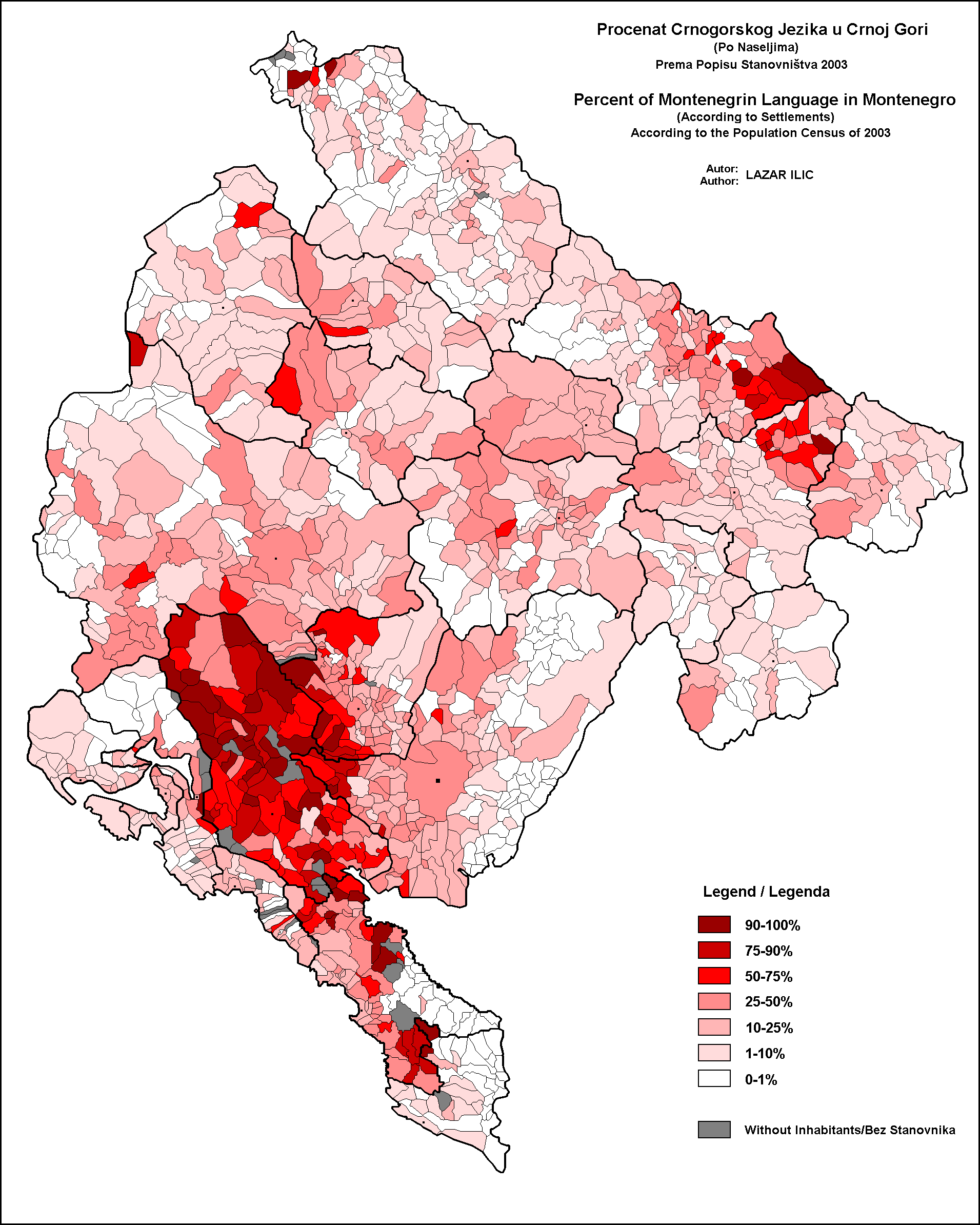
Montenegrin language in Montenegro by municipalities 2003

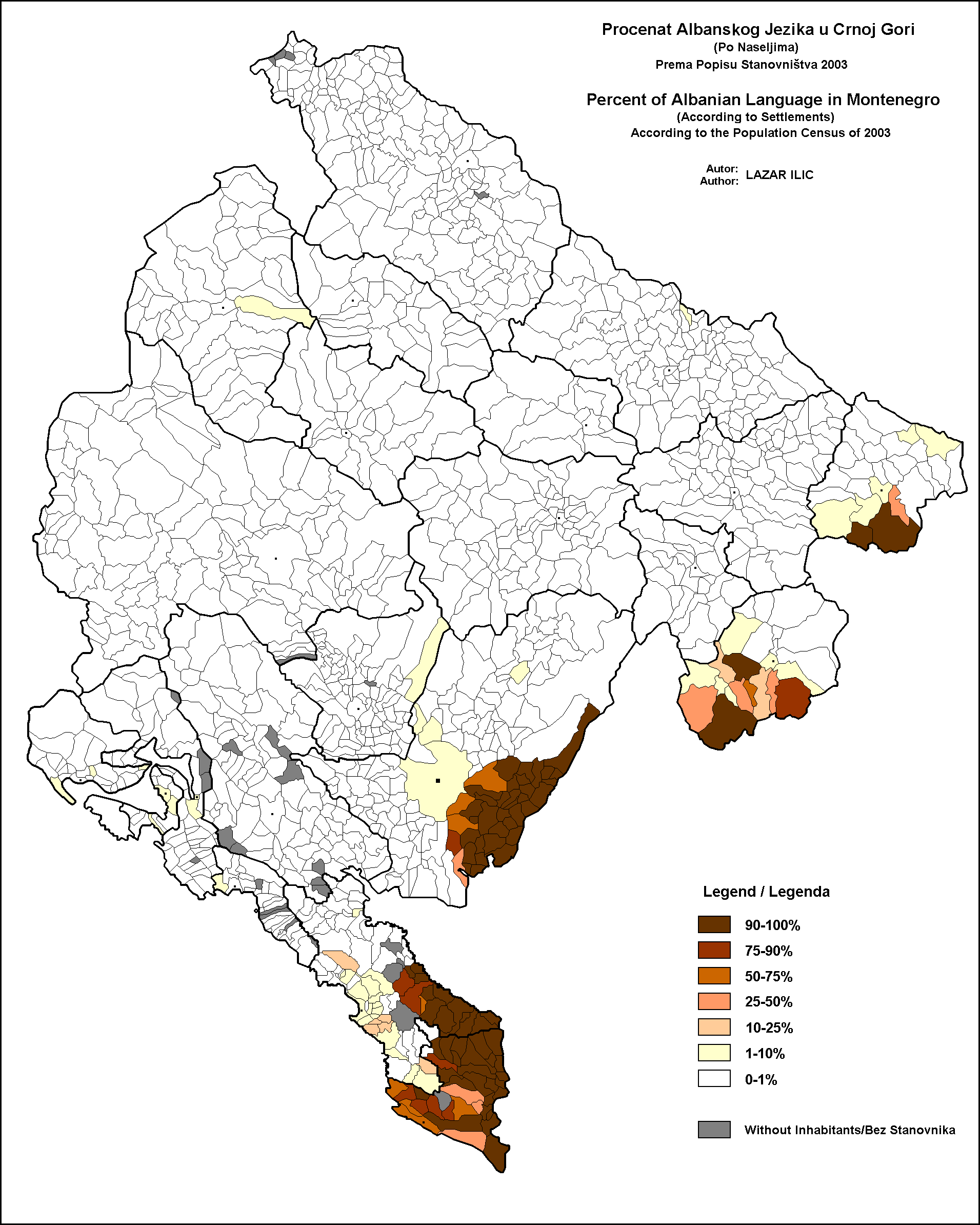
Albanian language in Montenegro by municipalities 2003

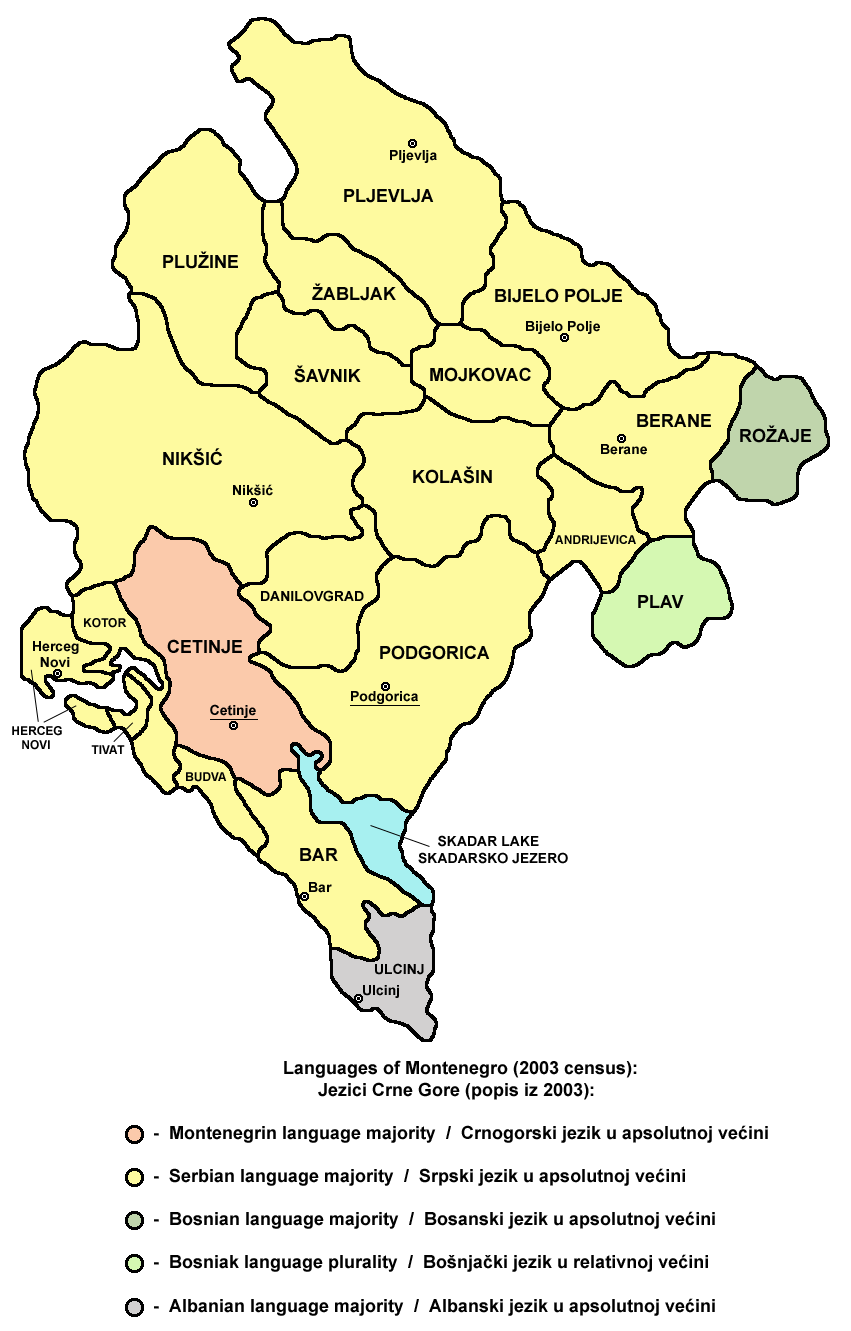
Linguistic structure of Montenegro by municipalities 2003

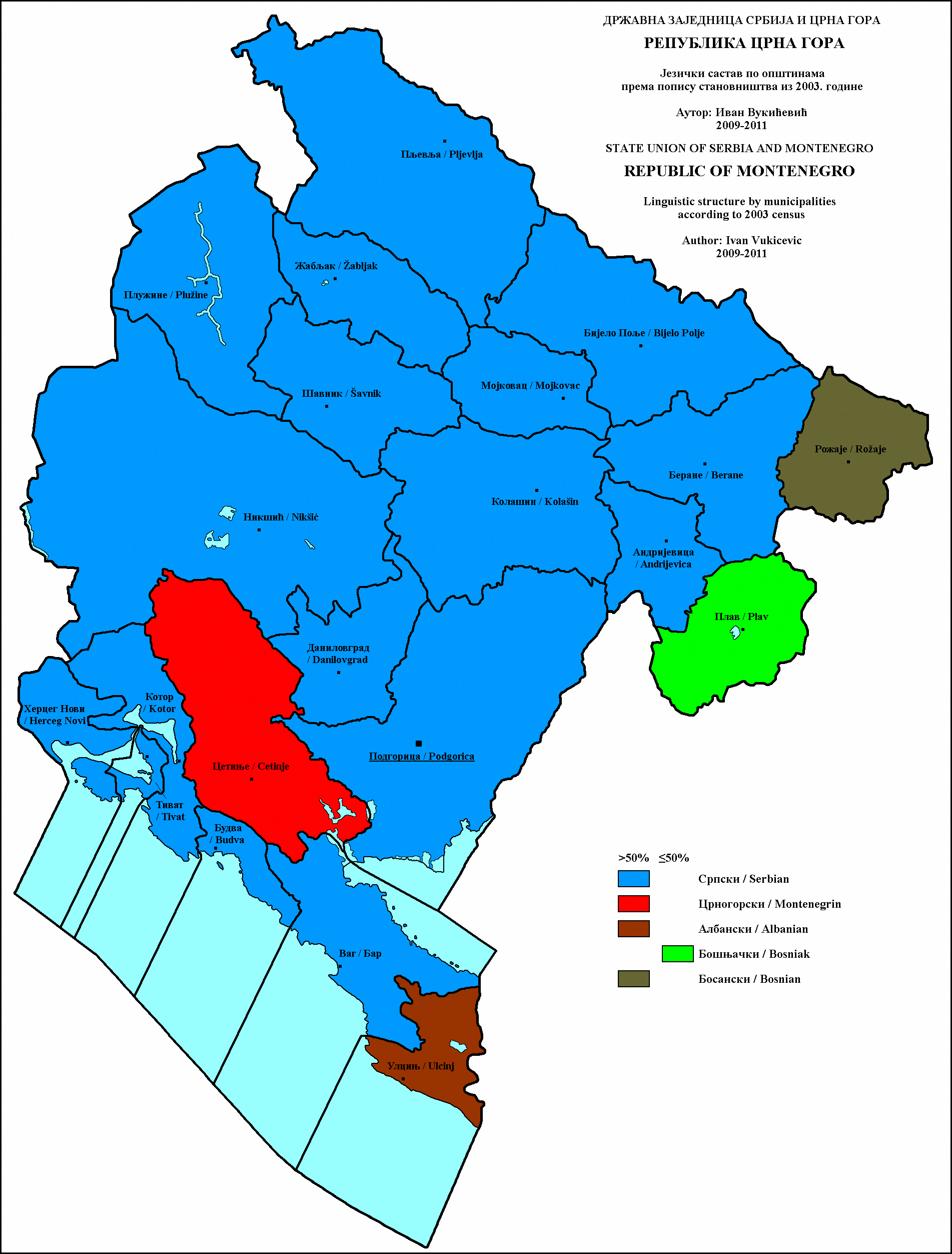
Linguistic structure of Montenegro by municipalities 2003

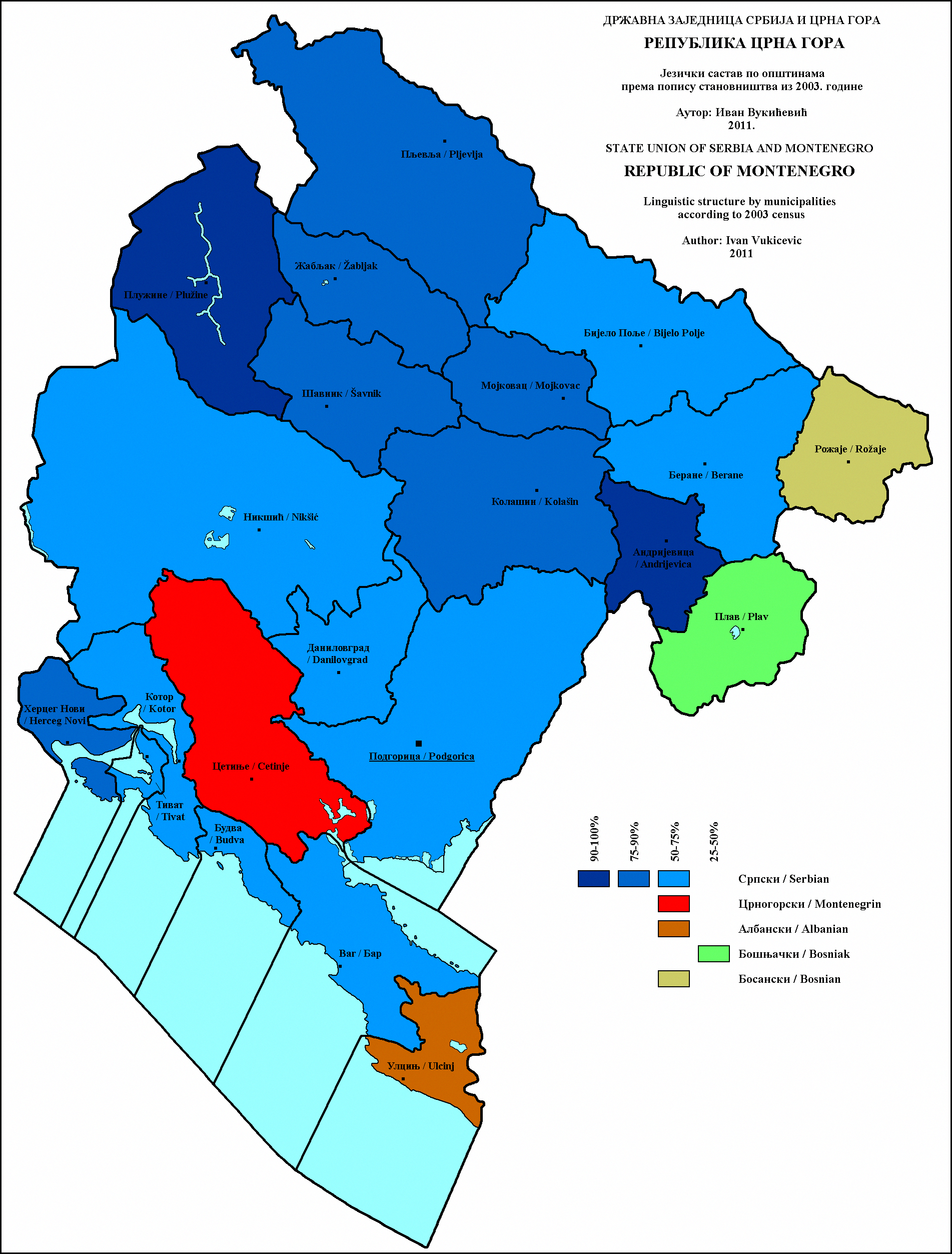
Linguistic structure of Montenegro by municipalities 2003

=== Religious structure ===
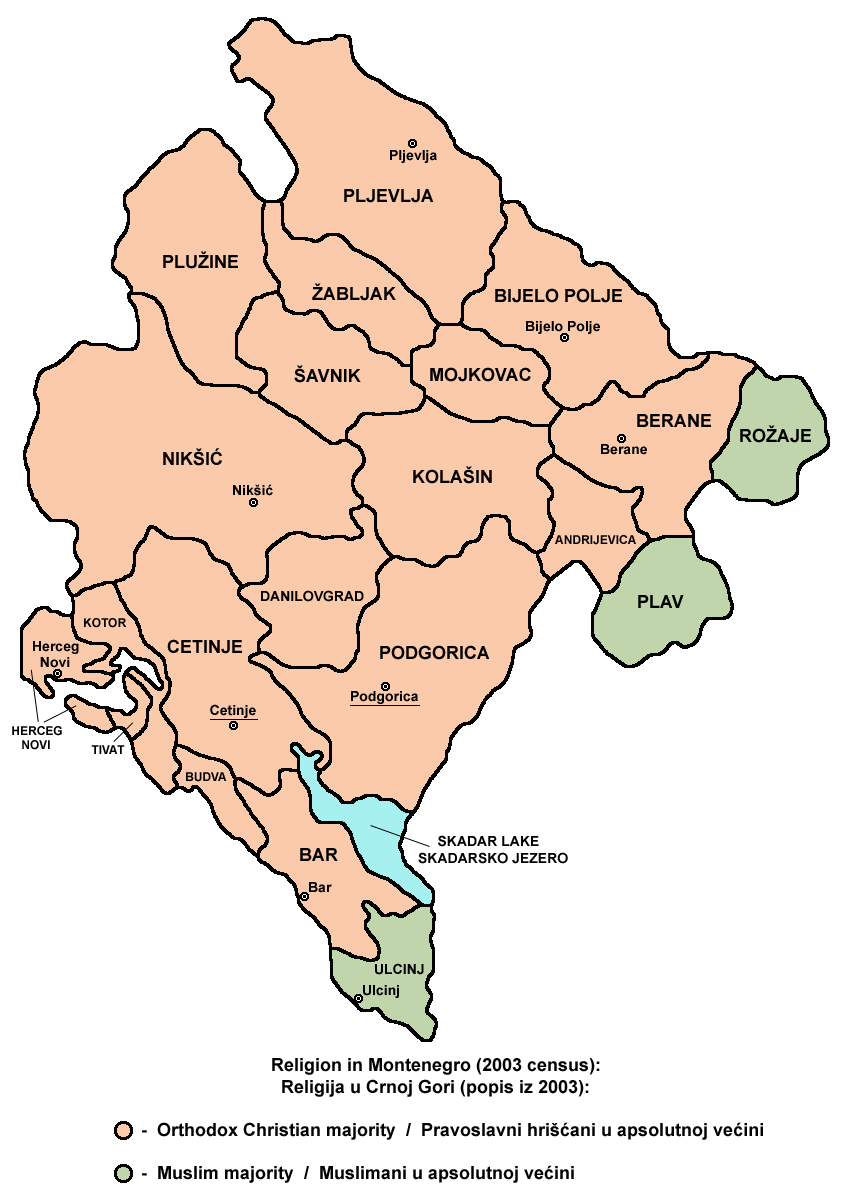
Religion structure of Montenegro by municipalities 2003

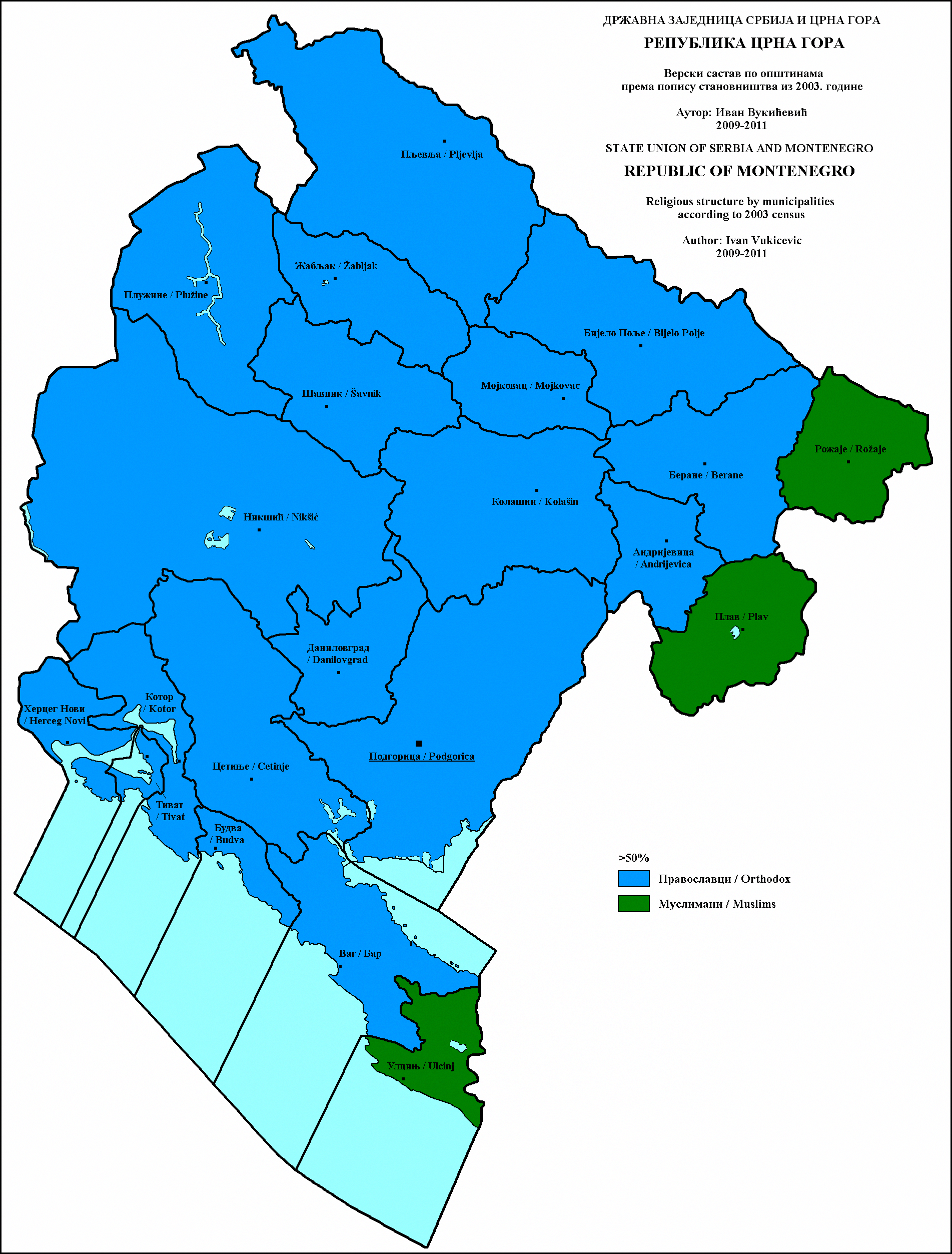
Religious structure of Montenegro by municipalities 2003

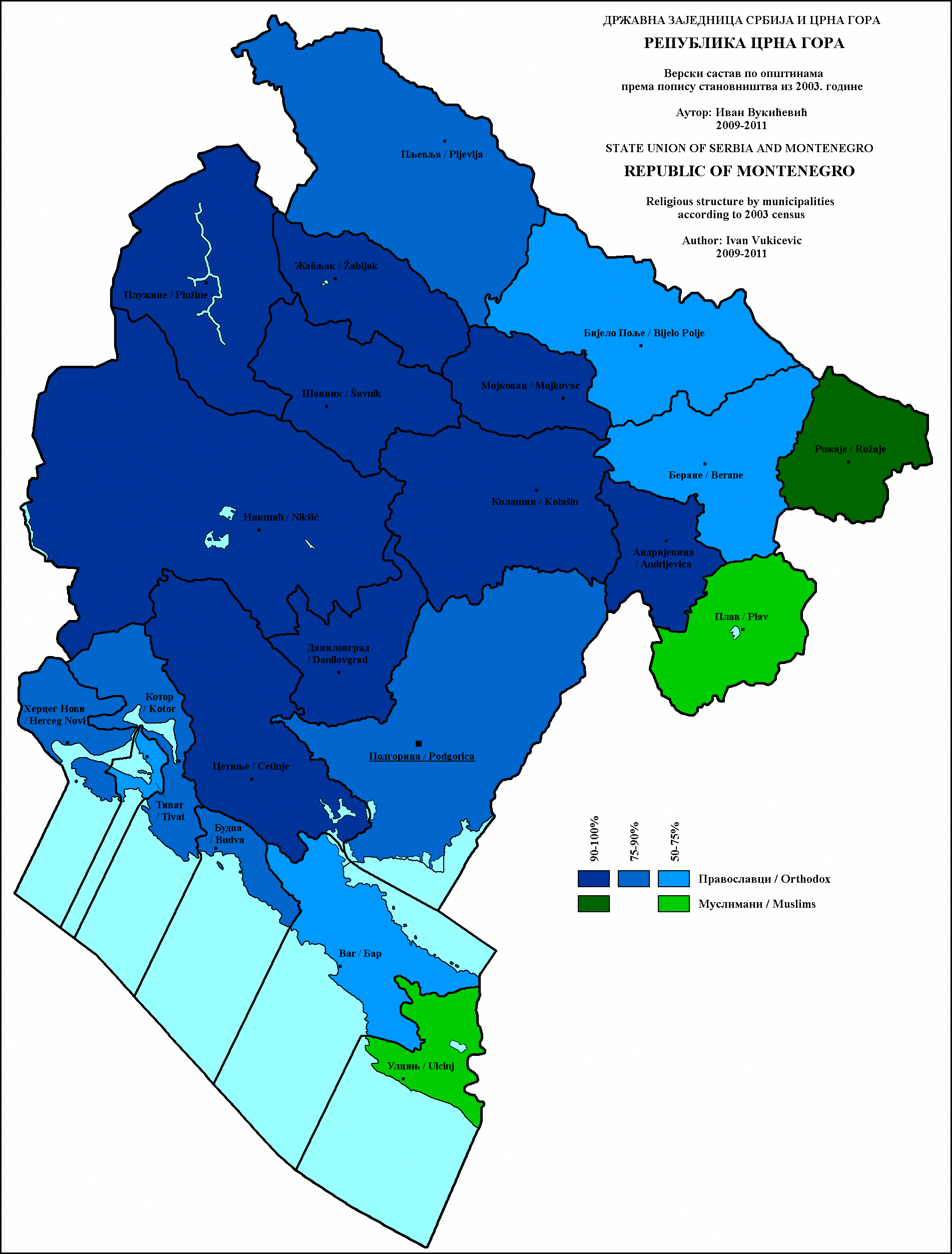
Religious structure of Montenegro by municipalities 2003

== 2011 ==
Total: 620,029

=== Ethnic structure ===
- Montenegrins 278,865 (44.98%)
- Serbs 178,110 (28.73%)
- Bosniaks 53,605 (8.65%)
- Albanians 30,439 (4.91%)
- ethnic Muslims 20,537 (3.31%)
- Roma 6,251 (1.01%)
- Croats 6,021 (0.97%)
- Others 46,201 (7.44%)
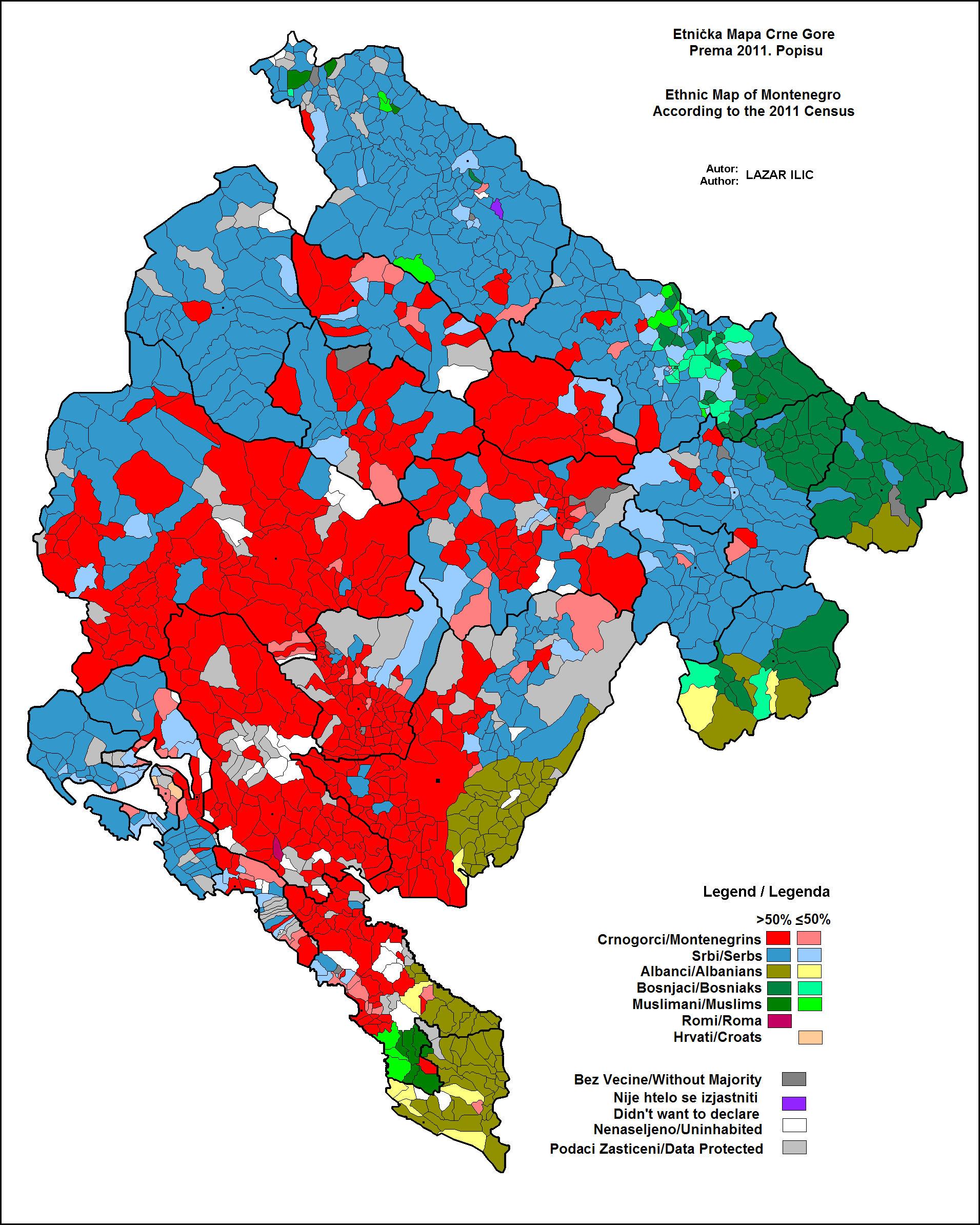
Ethnic structure of Montenegro by settlements, 2011

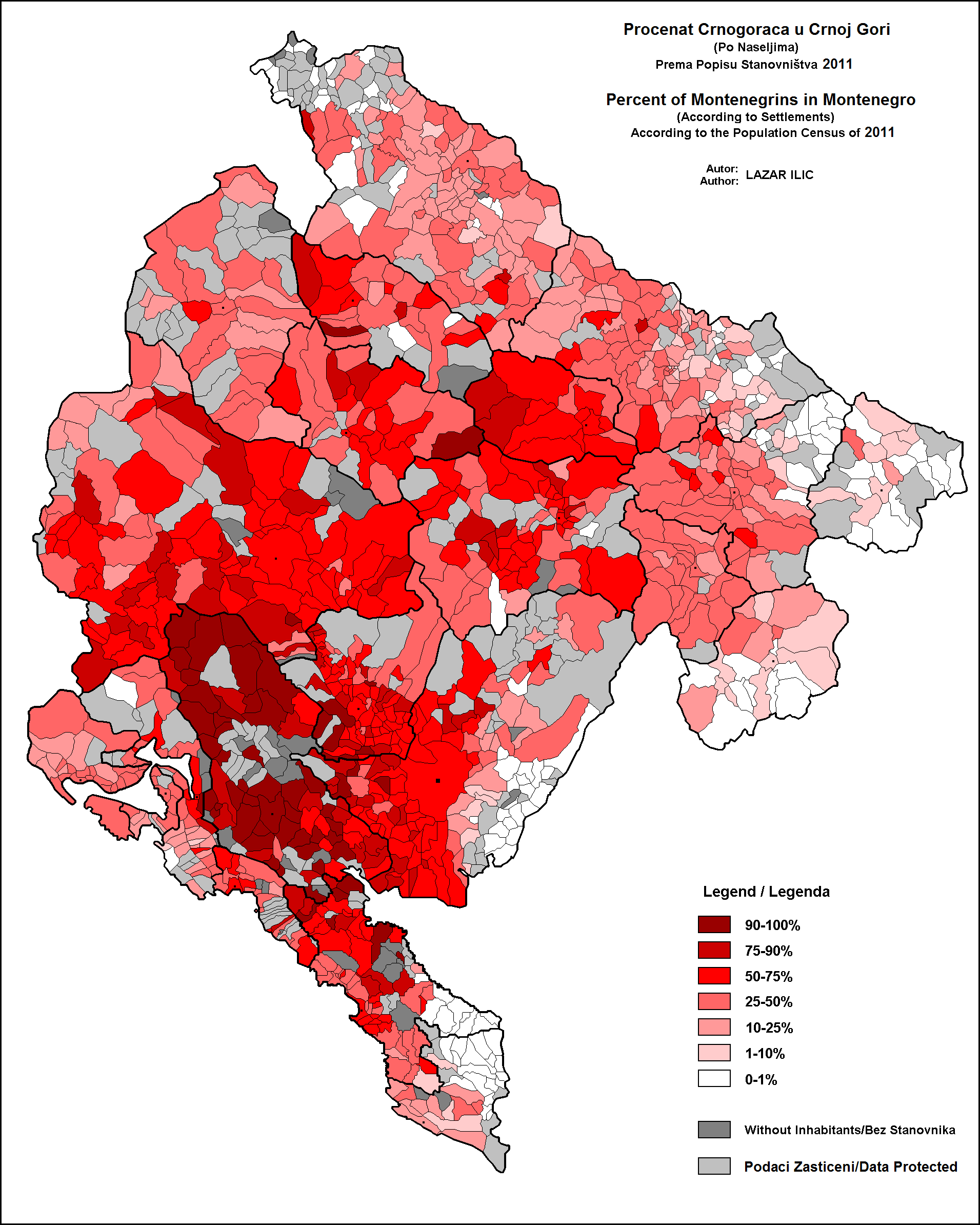
Percent of Montenegrins by settlements, 2011

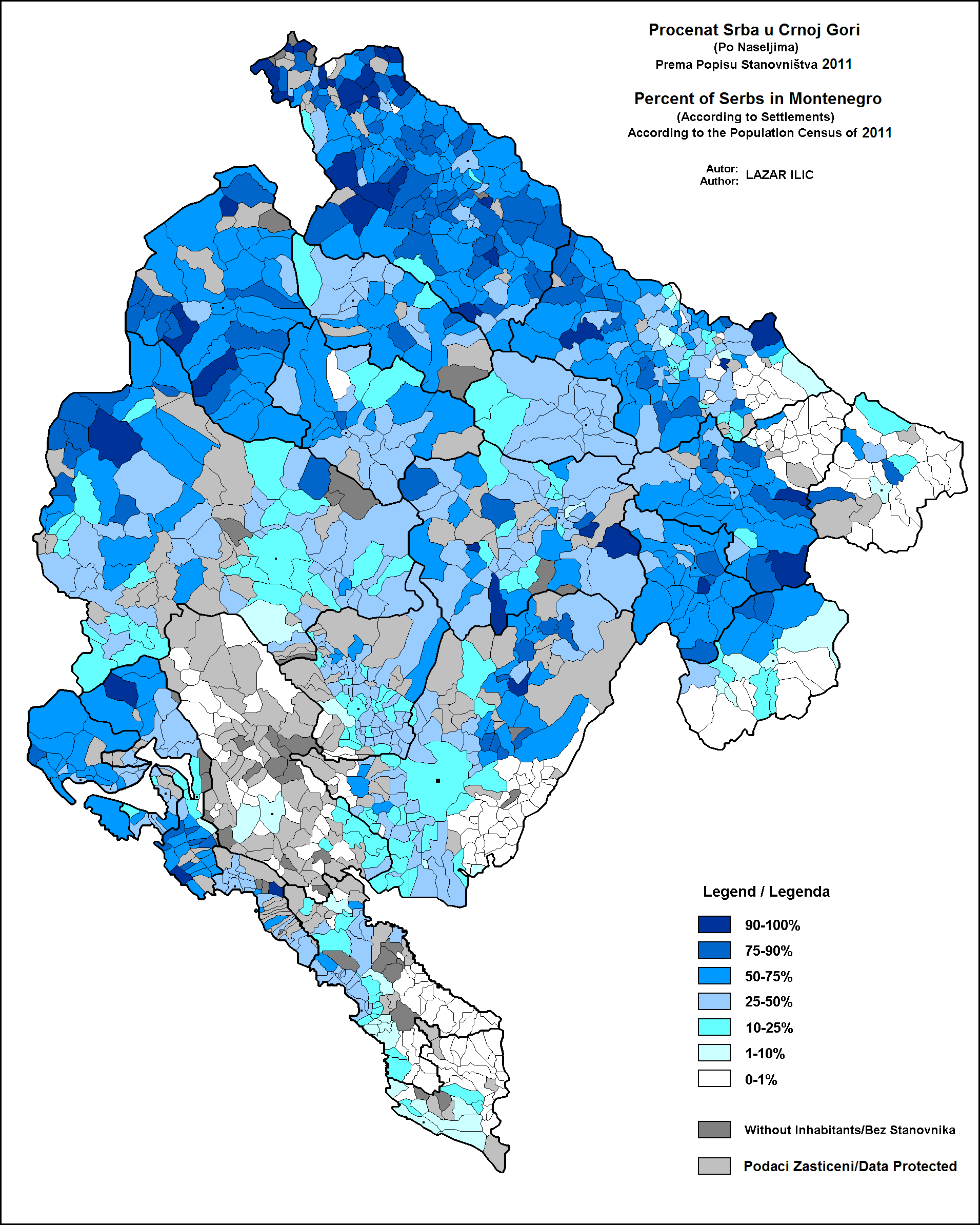
Percent of Serbs by settlements, 2011

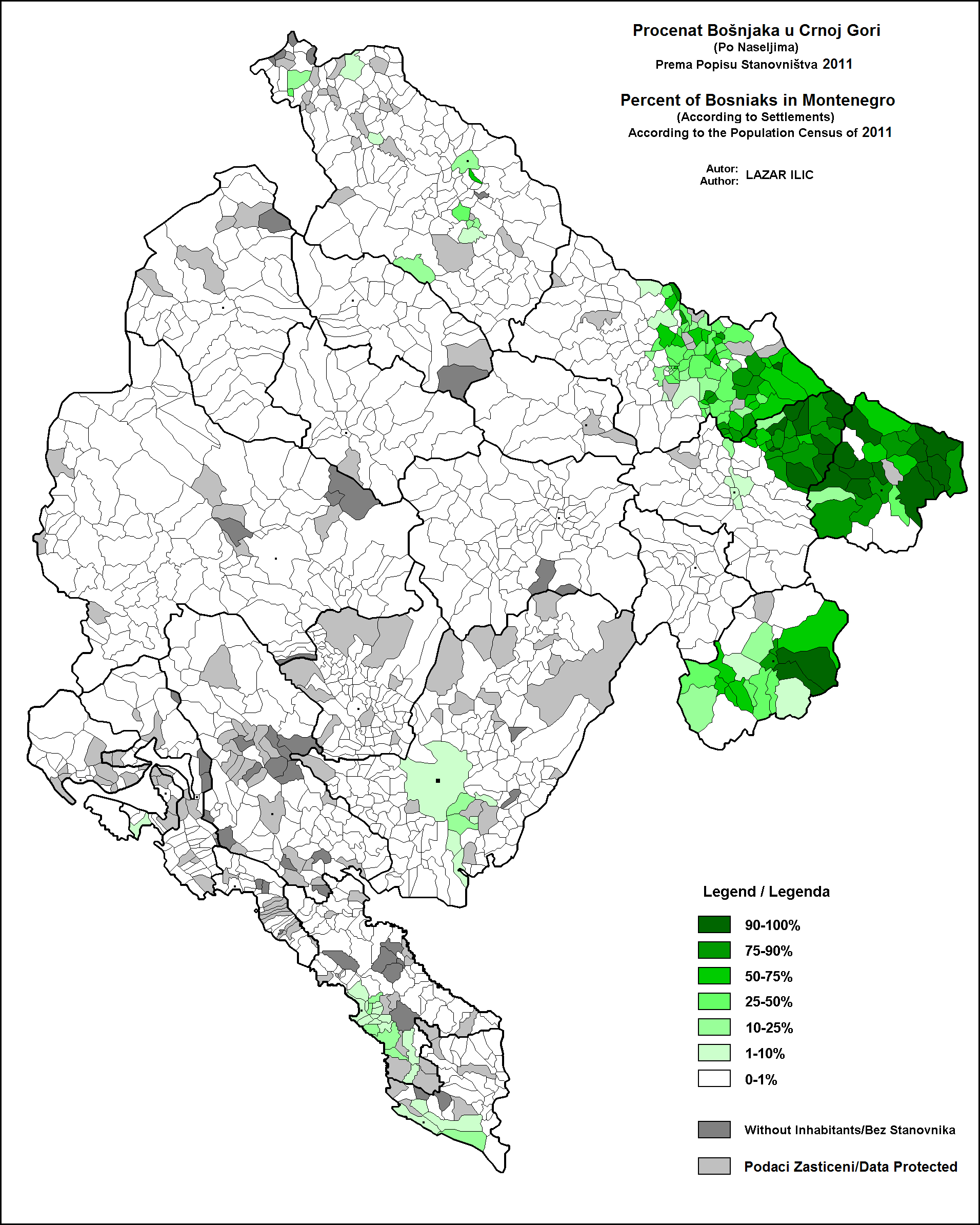
Percent of Bosniaks by settlements, 2011

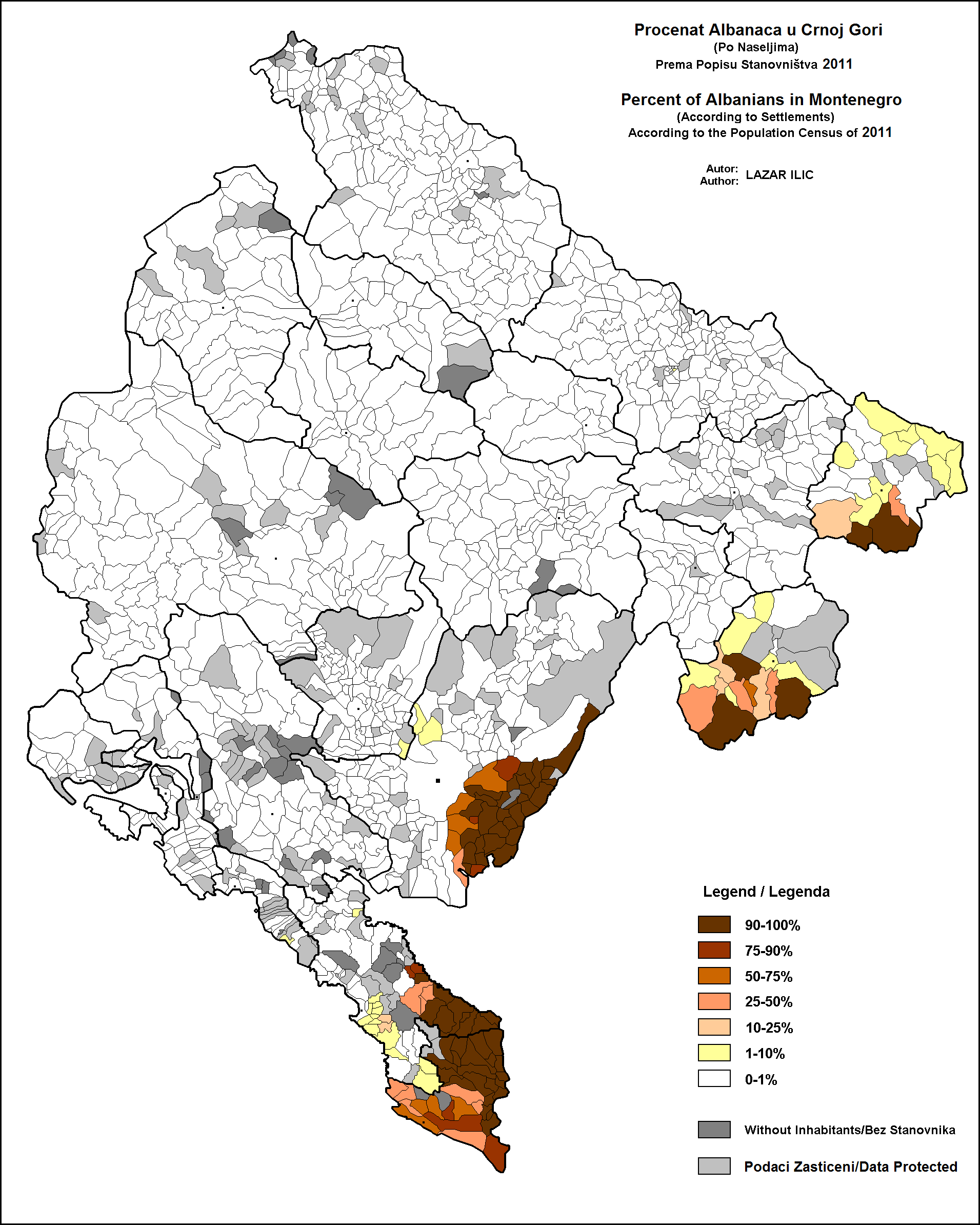
Percent of Albanians by settlements, 2011

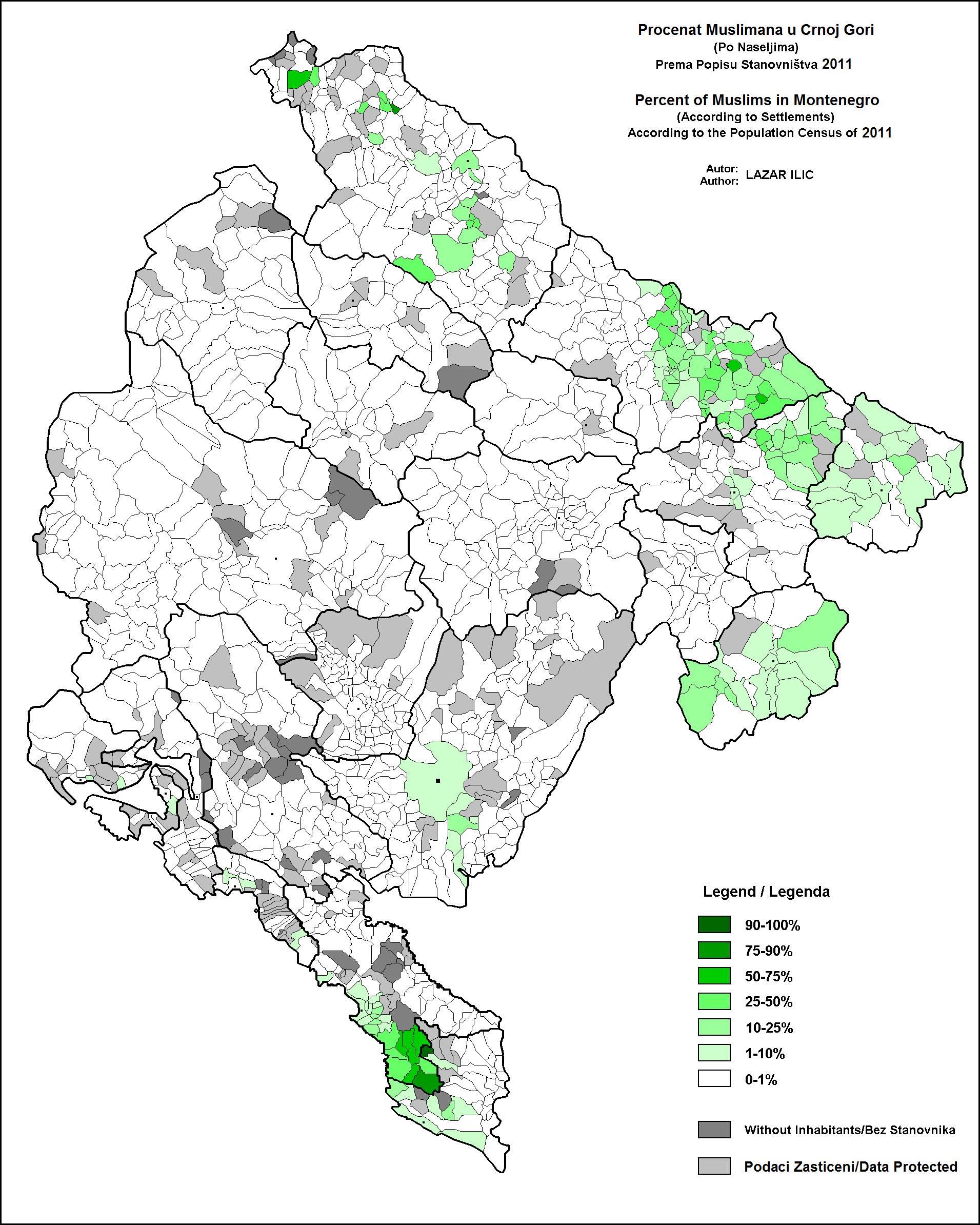
Percent of ethnic Muslims by settlements, 2011

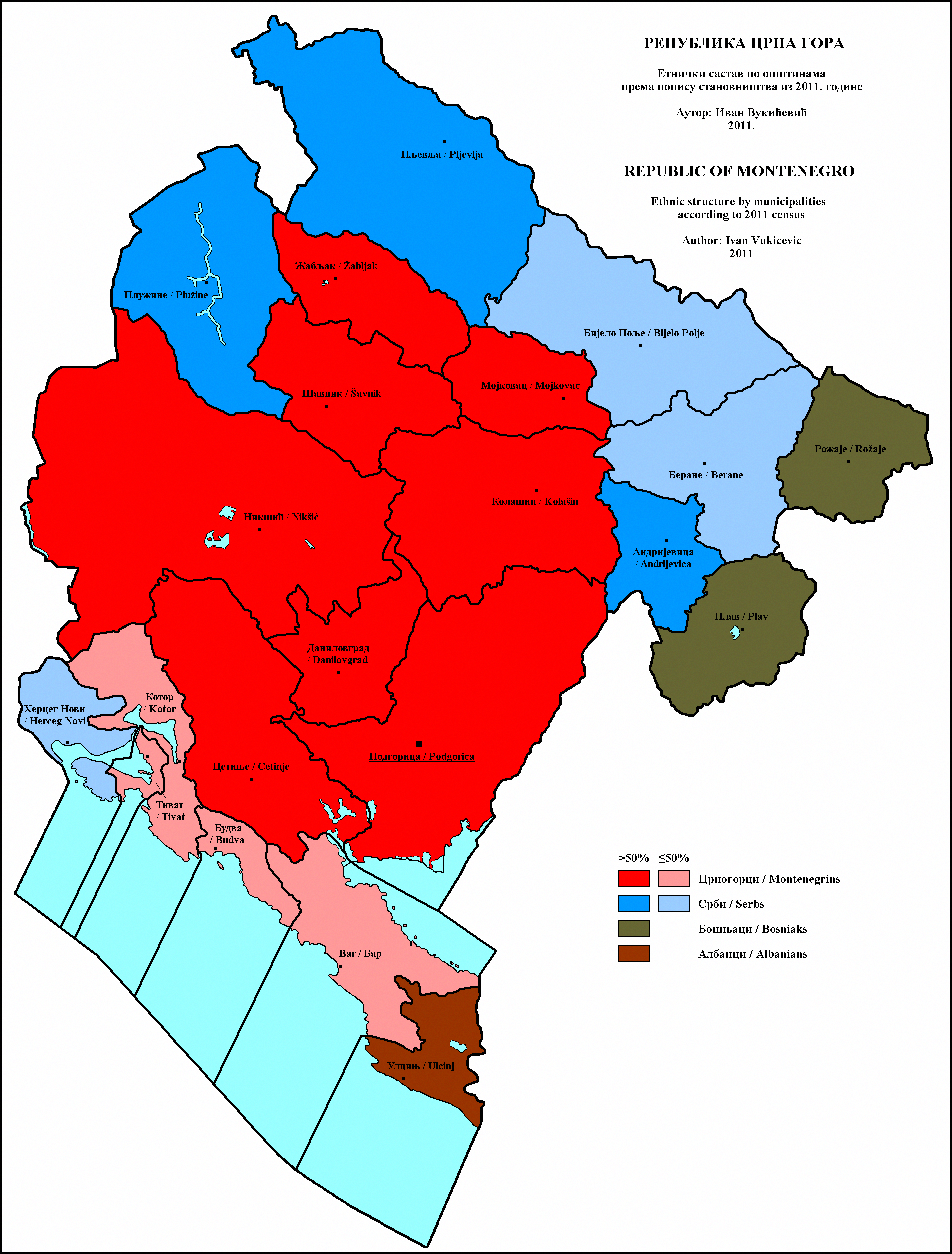
Ethnic structure of Montenegro by municipalities 2011

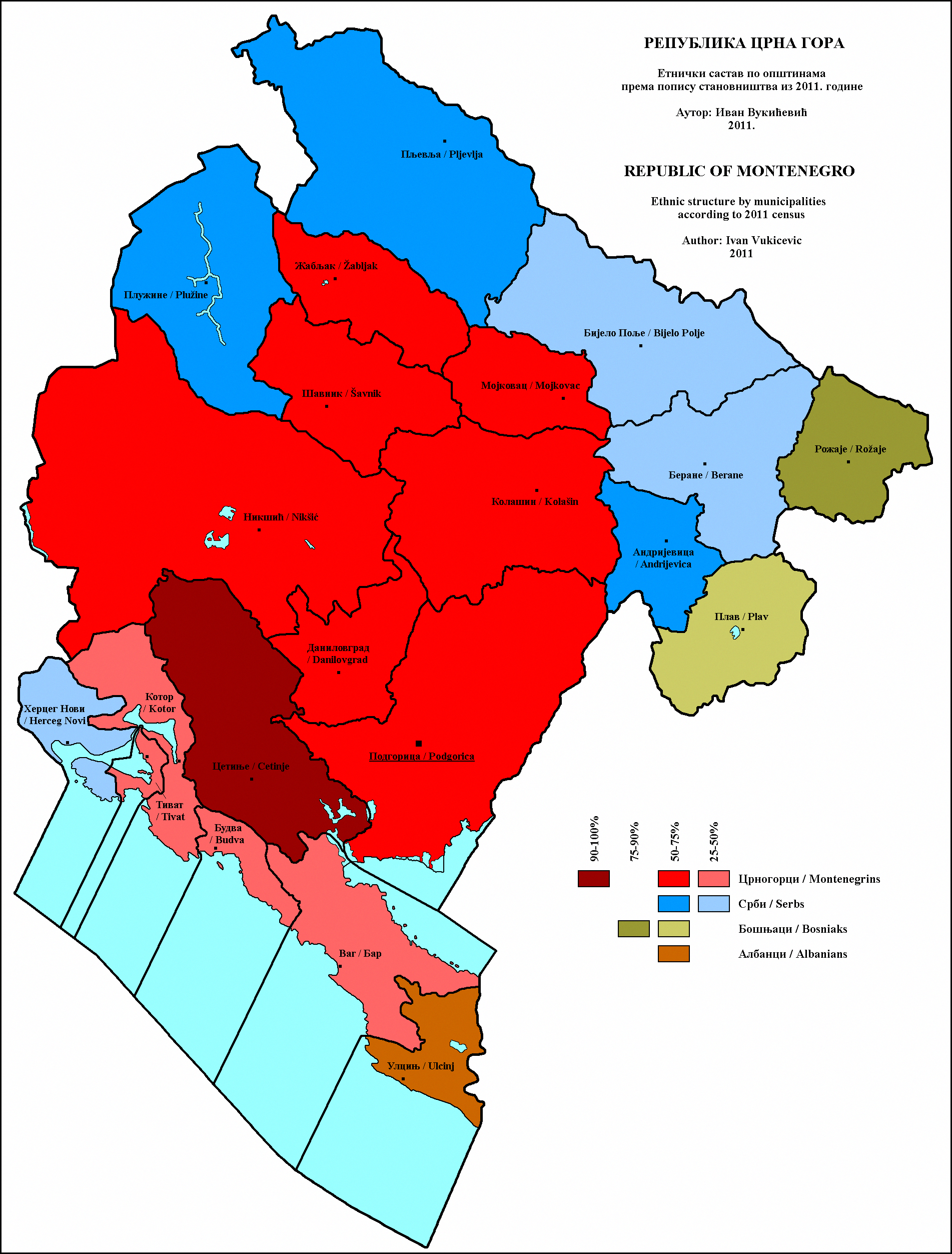
Ethnic structure of Montenegro by municipalities 2011

Ethnic structure of Montenegro by municipalities 2011

=== Linguistic structure ===
- Serbian: 265,895 (42.88%)
- Montenegrin: 229,251 (36.97%)
- Bosnian: 33,077 (5.33%)
- Albanian: 32,671 (5.27%)
- Roma: 5,169 (0.83%)
- Bosniak: 3,662 (0.59%)
- Croatian: 2,791 (0.45%)
- Others: 47,513 (7.68%)
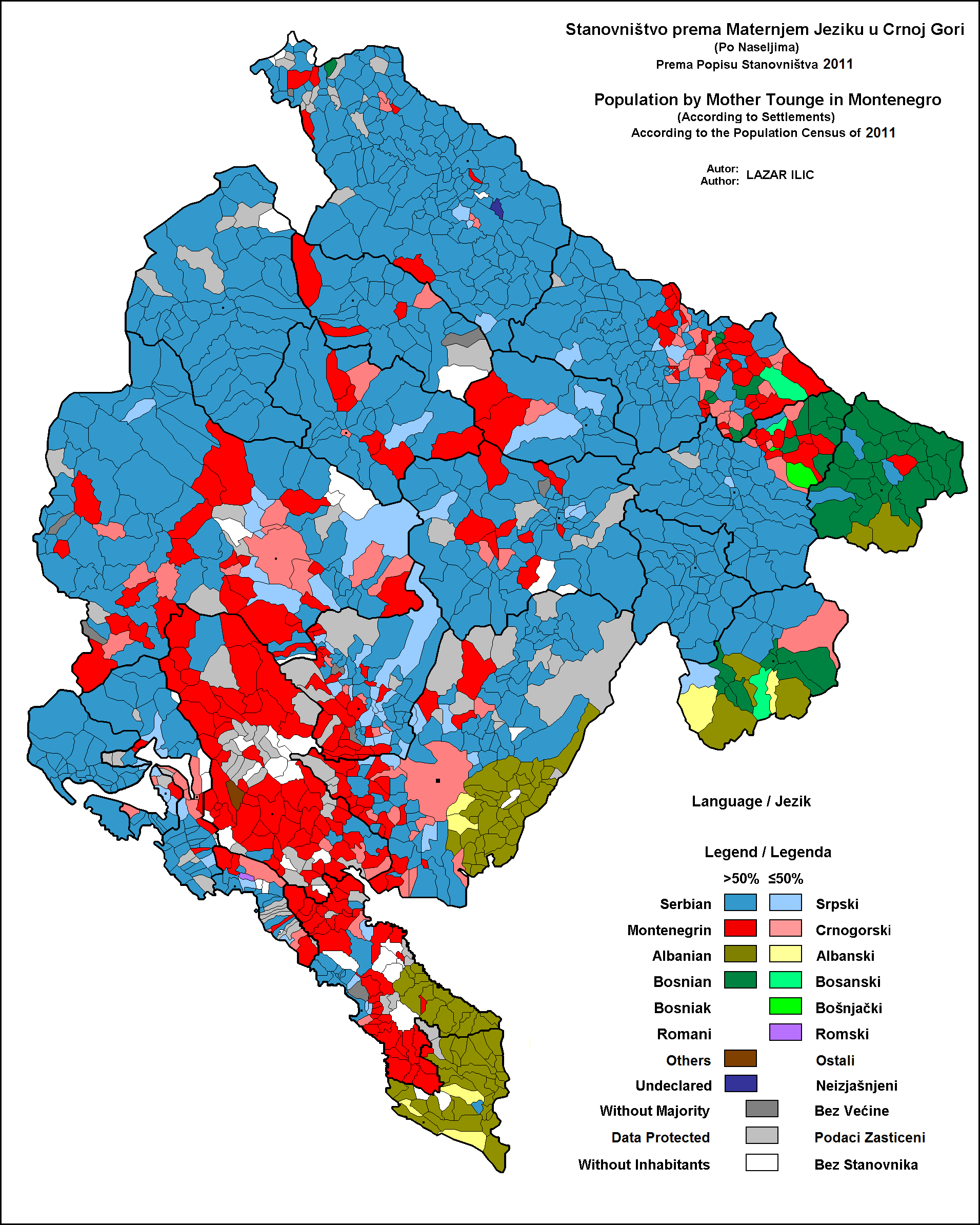
Linguistic structure of Montenegro by settlements, 2011

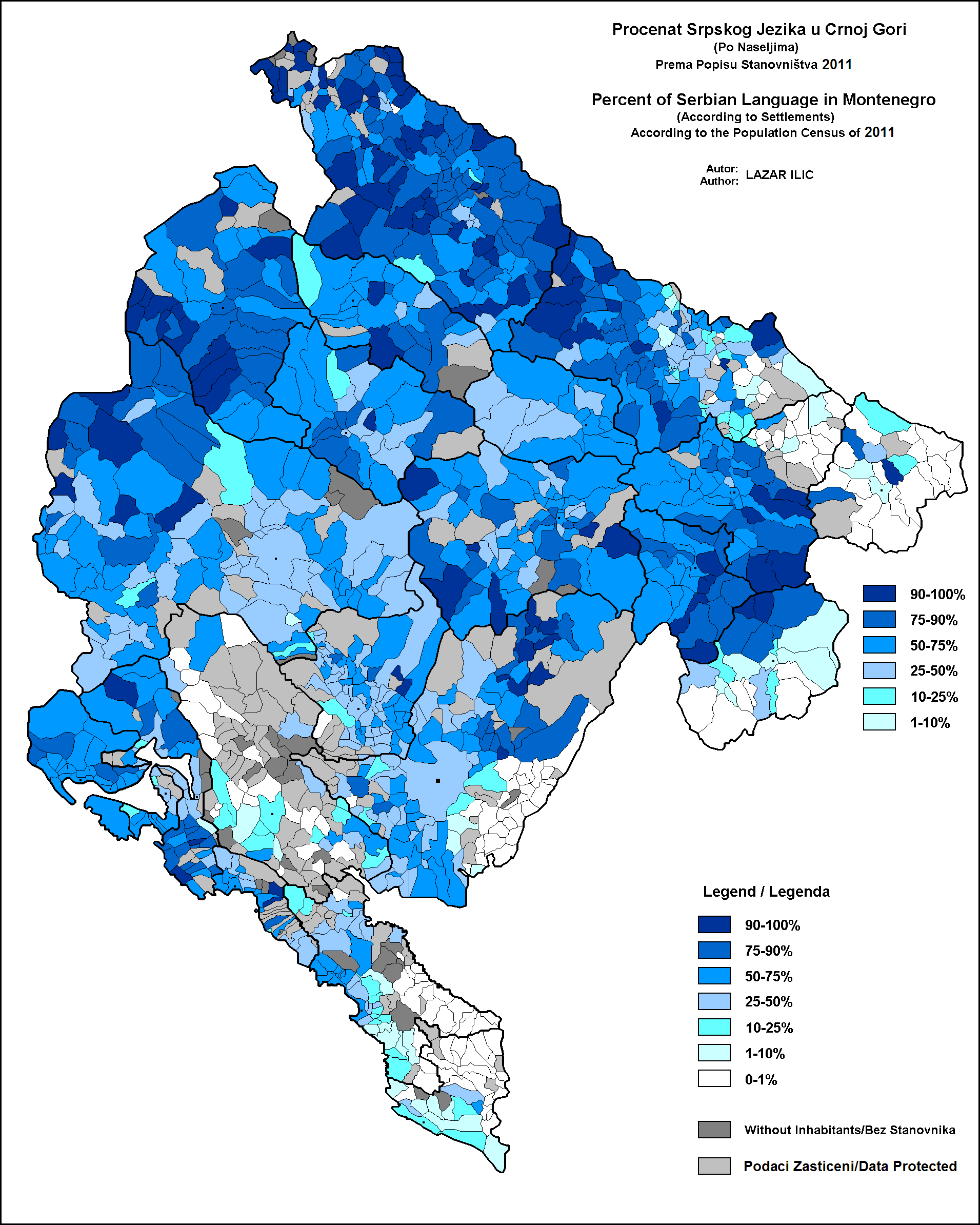
Percent of Serbian language in Montenegro by settlements, 2011

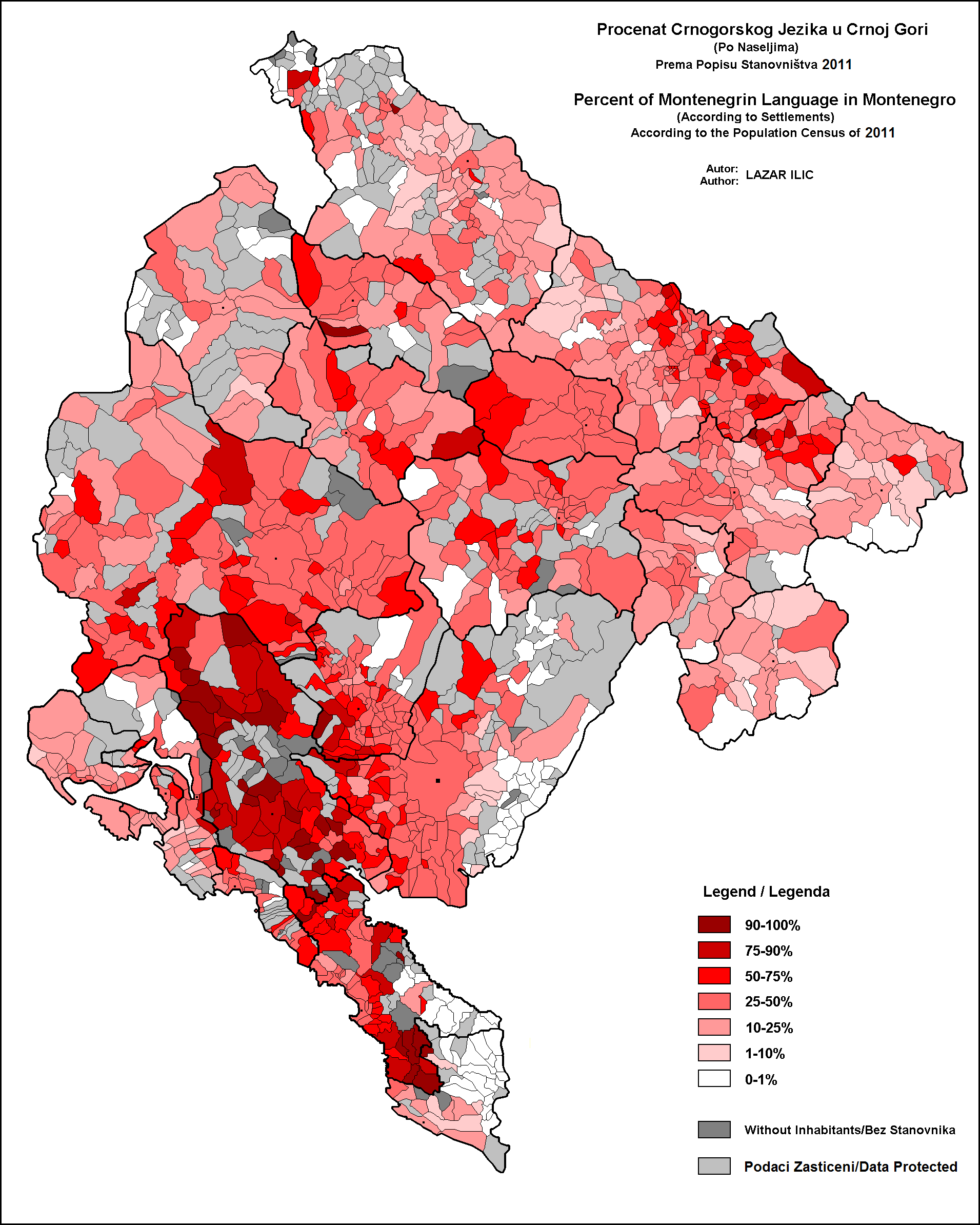
Percent of Montenegrin language in Montenegro by settlements, 2011

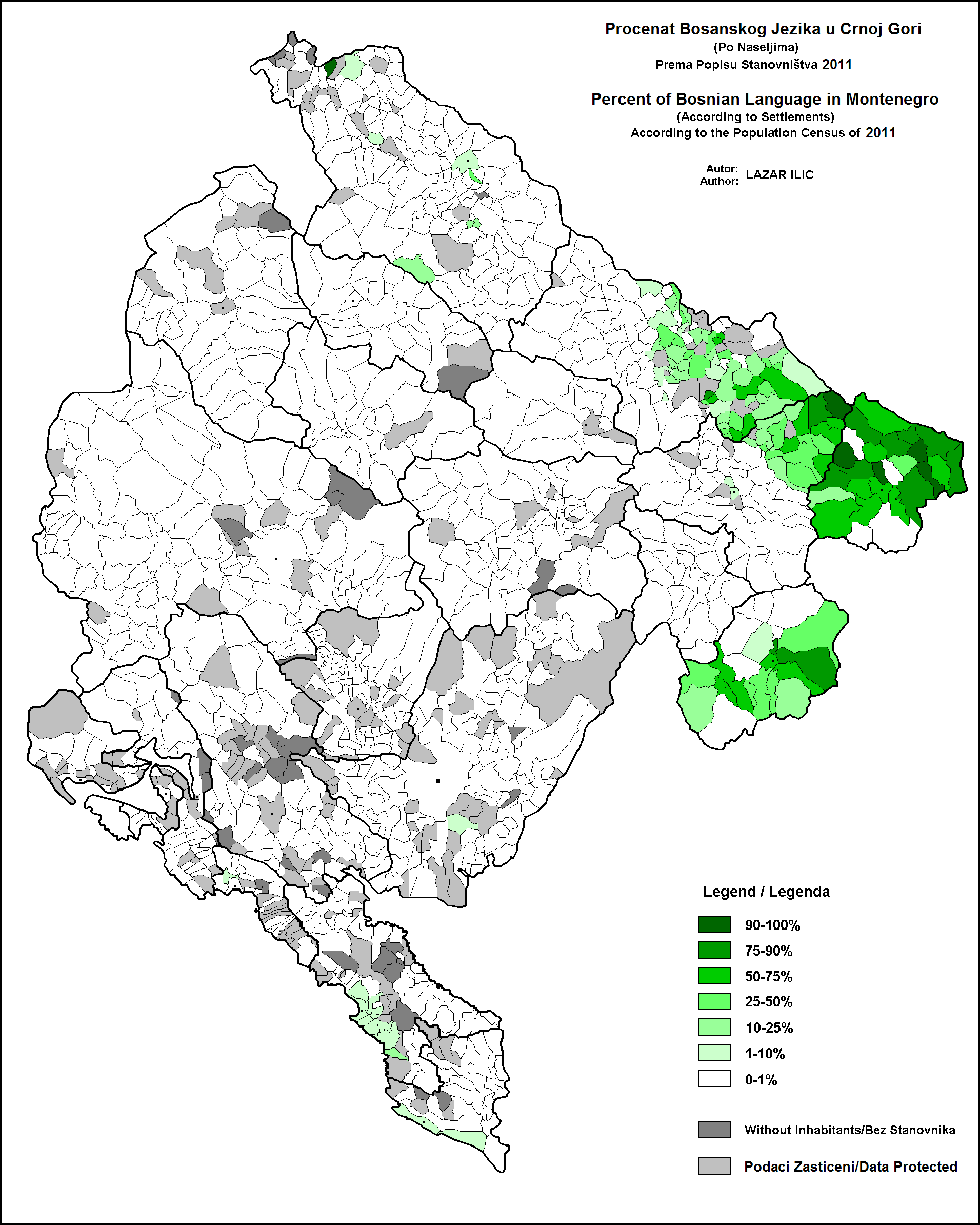
Percent of Bosnian language in Montenegro by settlements, 2011

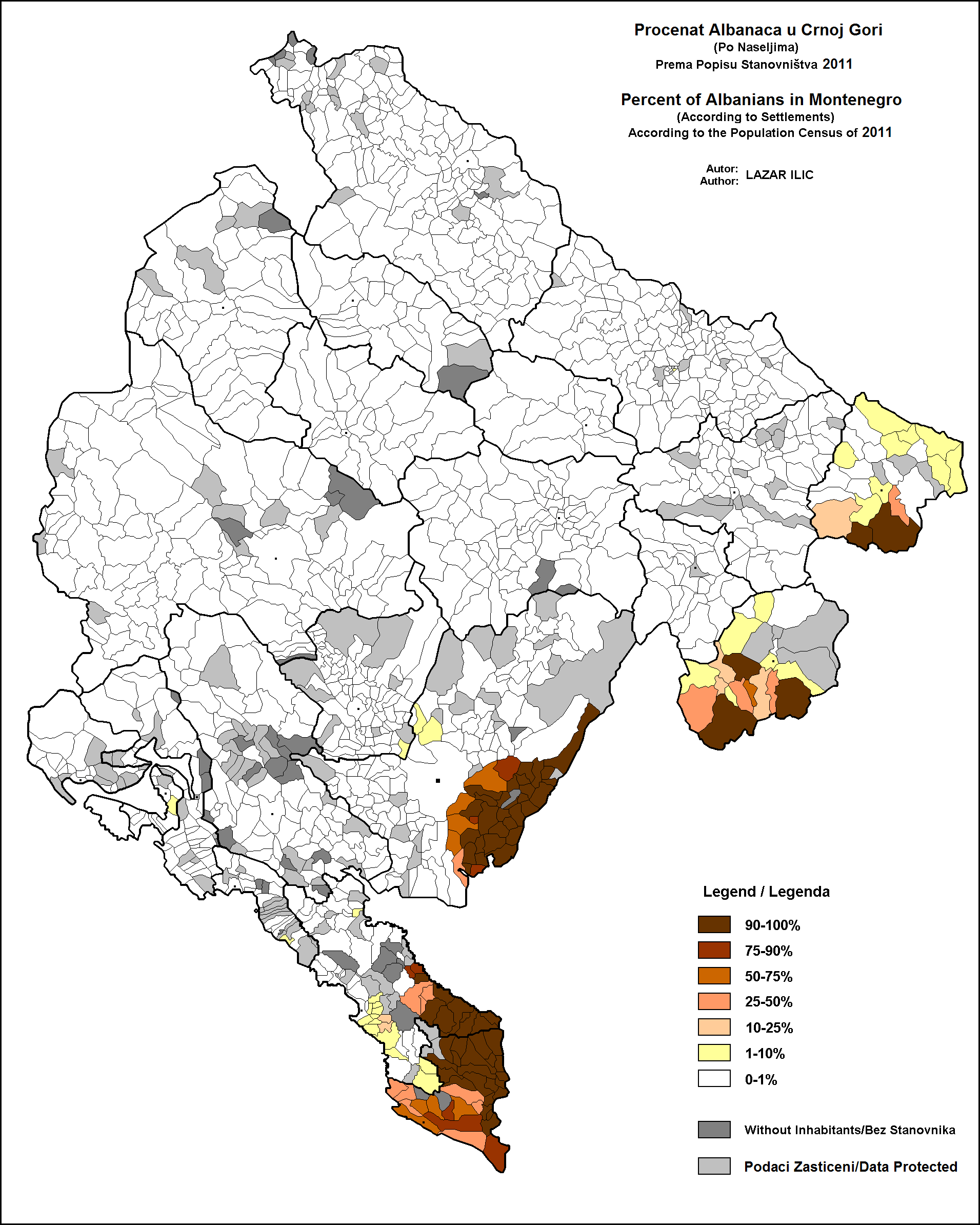
Percent of Albanian language in Montenegro by settlements, 2011

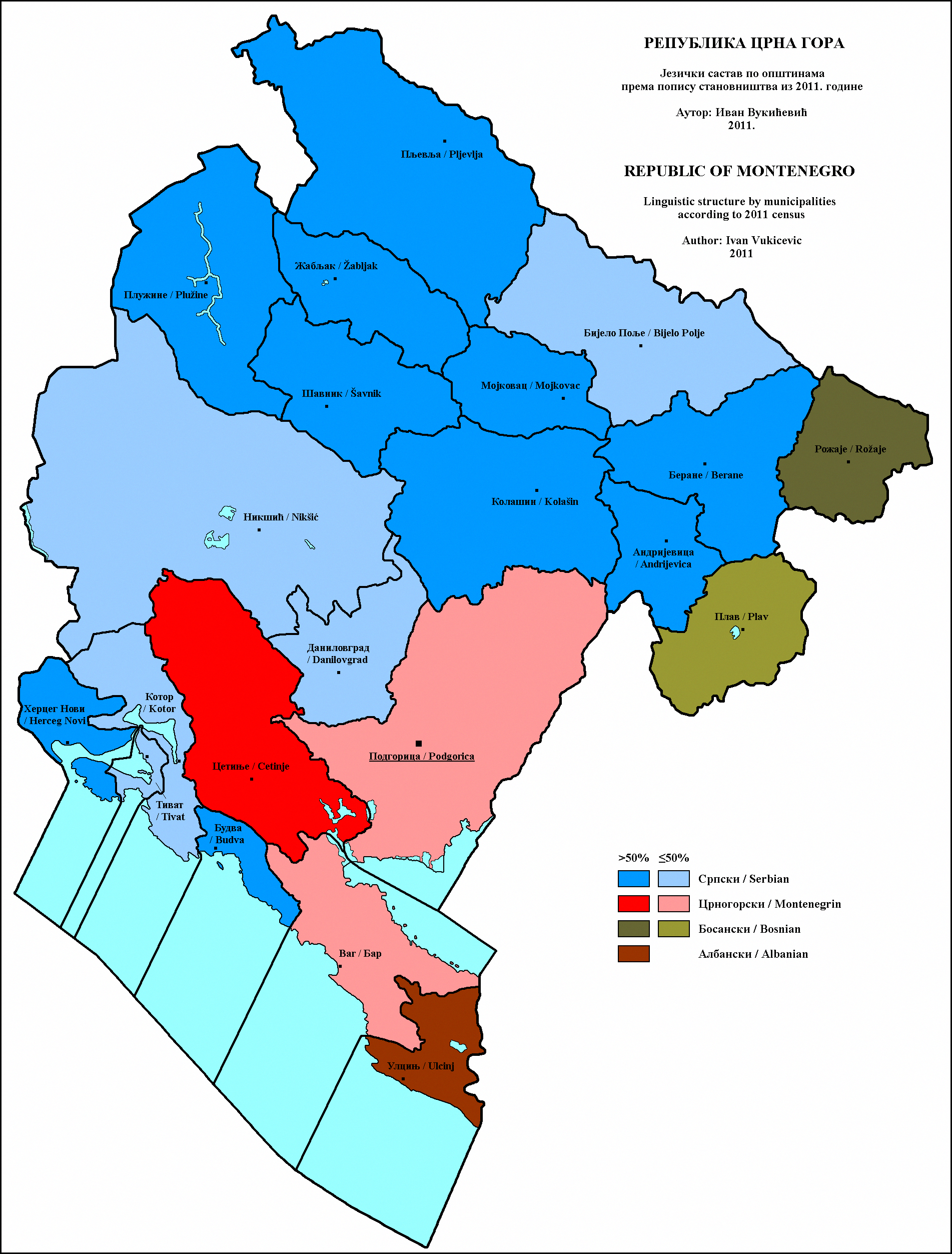
Linguistic structure of Montenegro by municipalities 2011

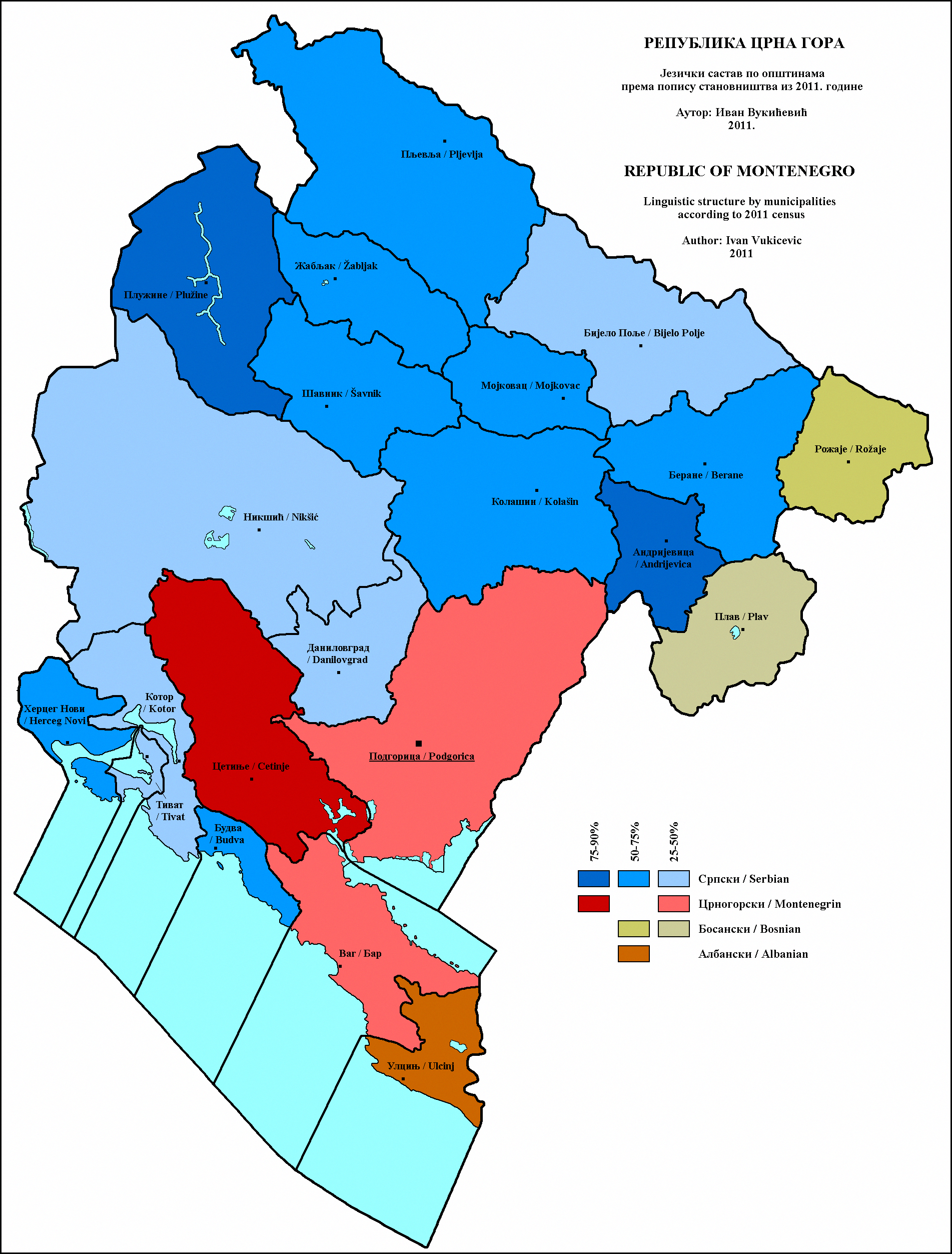
Linguistic structure of Montenegro by municipalities 2011

Linguistic structure of Montenegro by municipalities 2011

=== Religious structure ===
- Eastern Orthodox - 446,858 (72.07%)
- Muslims - 118,477 (19.11%)
- Catholic - 21,299 (3.44%)
- Others 27,756 (5.38%)
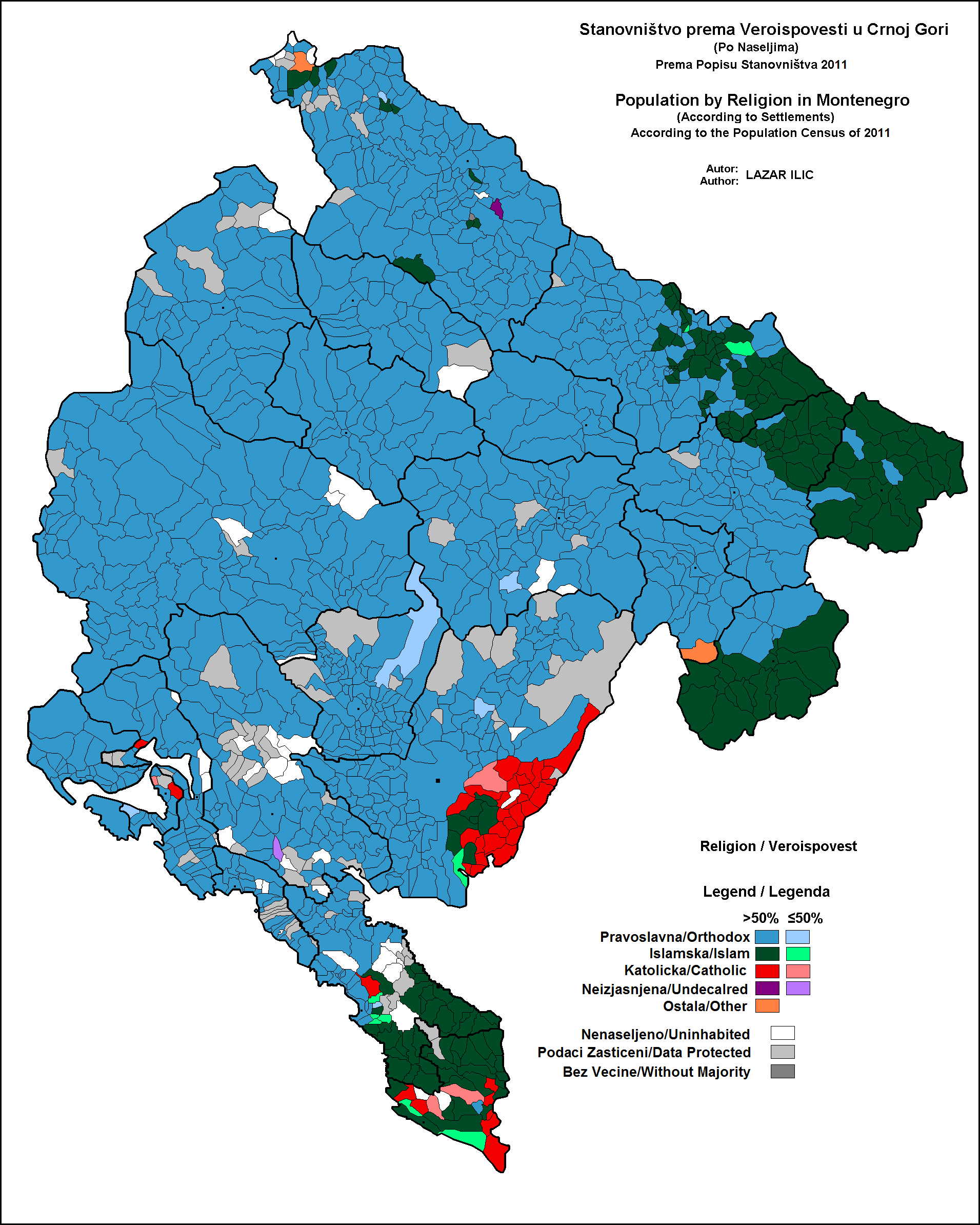
Religious structure of Montenegro by settlements, 2011

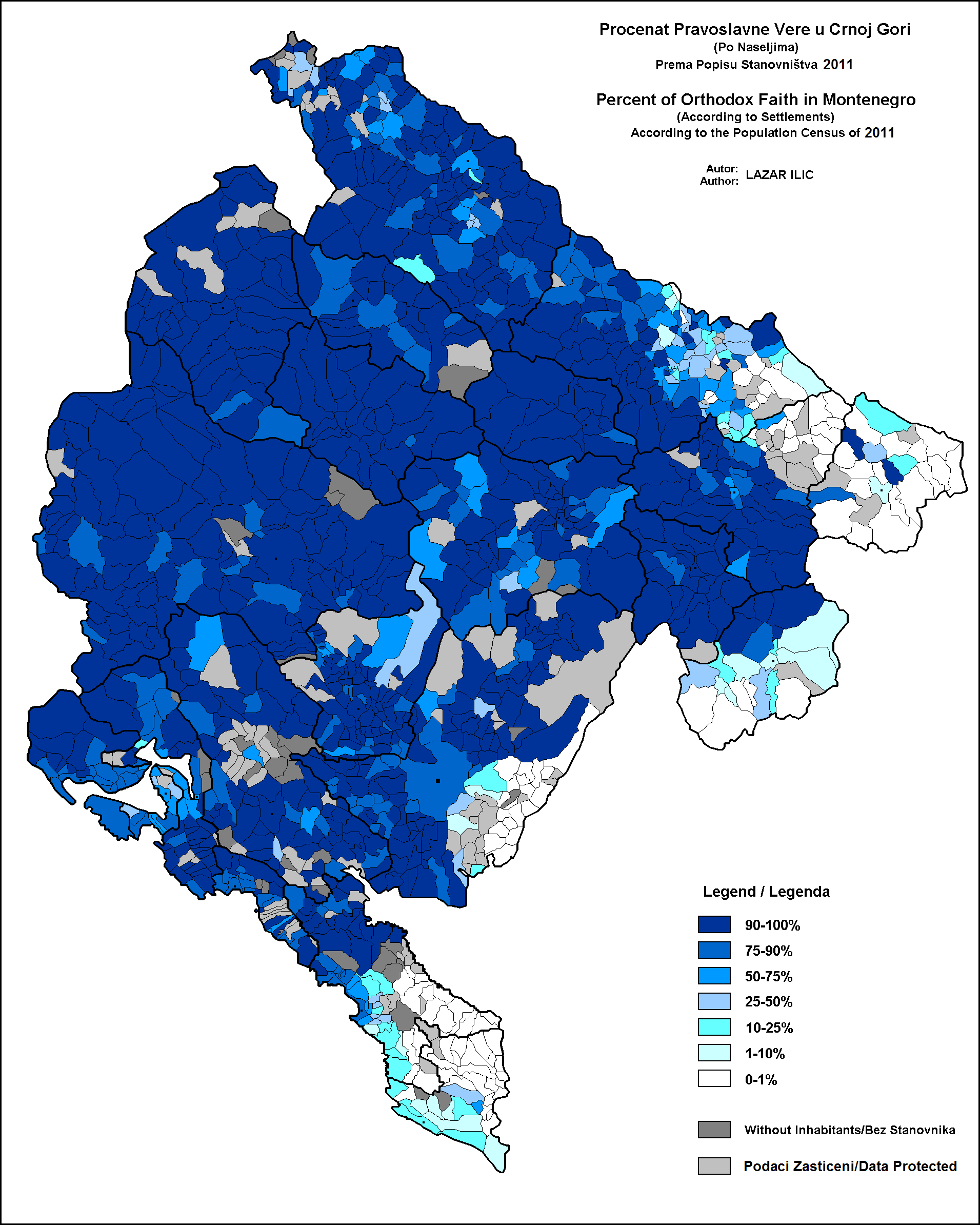
Percent of Orthodox faith in Montenegro by settlements, 2011

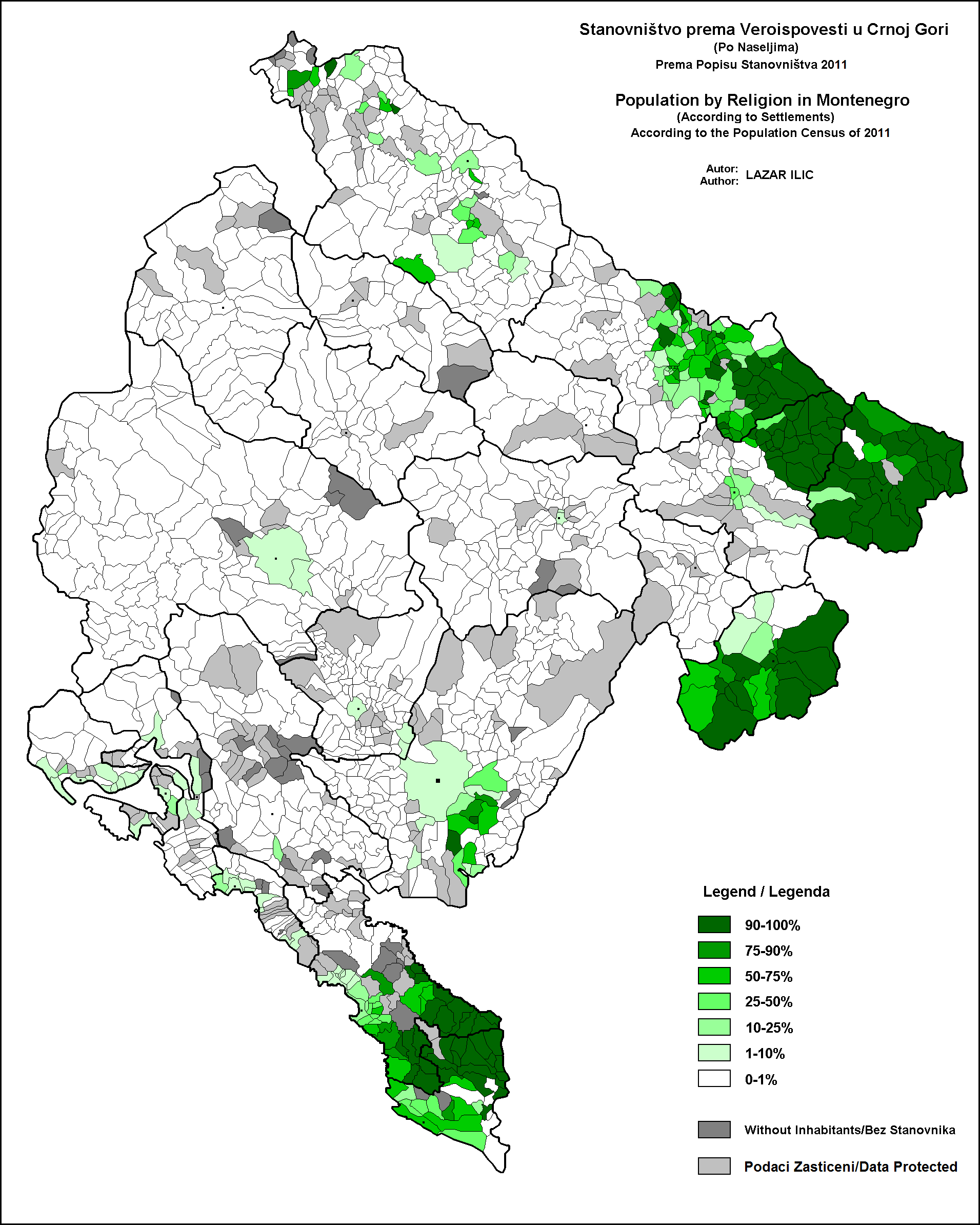
Percent of Islamic faith in Montenegro by settlements, 2011

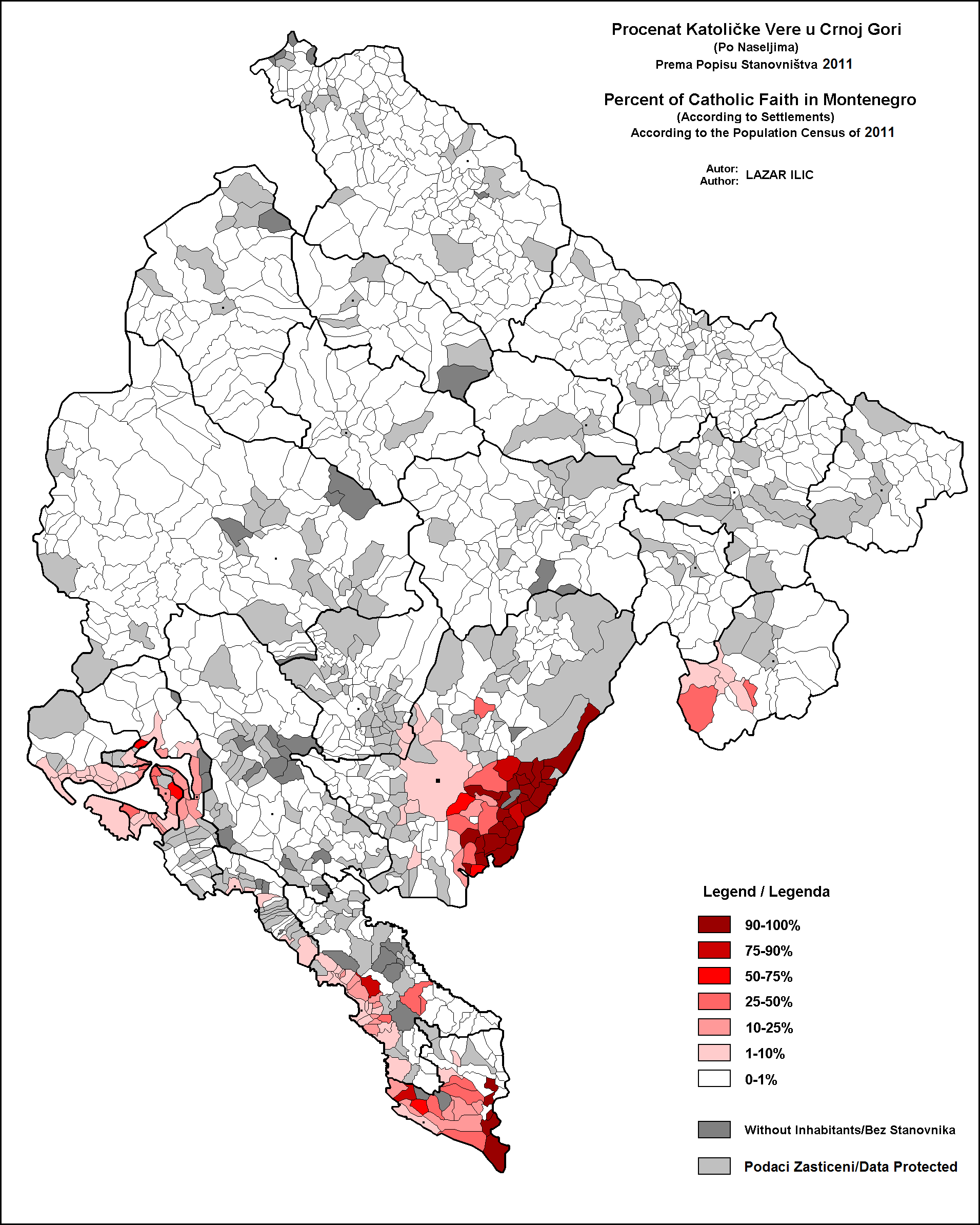
Percent of Catholic faith in Montenegro by settlements, 2011

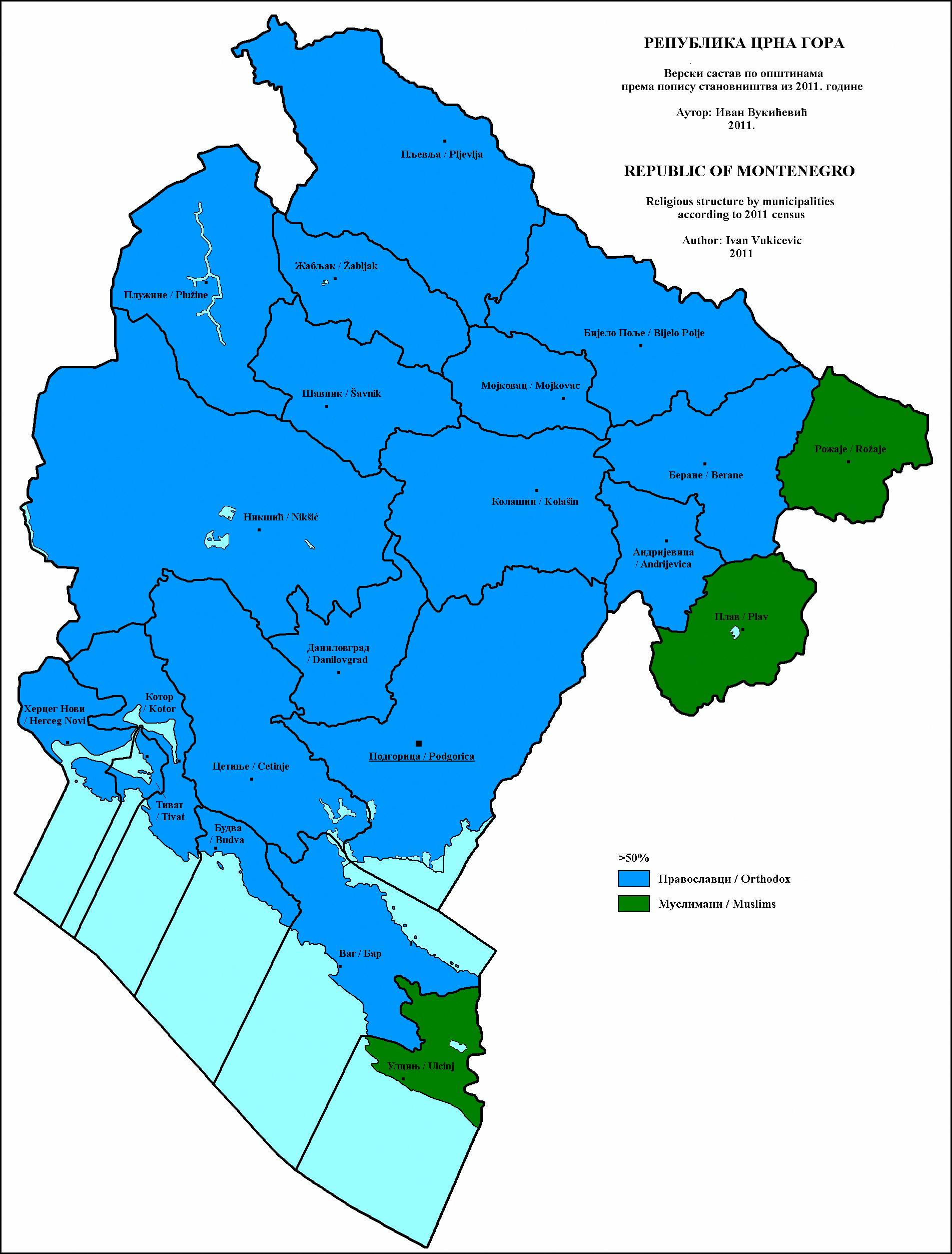
Religious structure of Montenegro by municipalities 2011

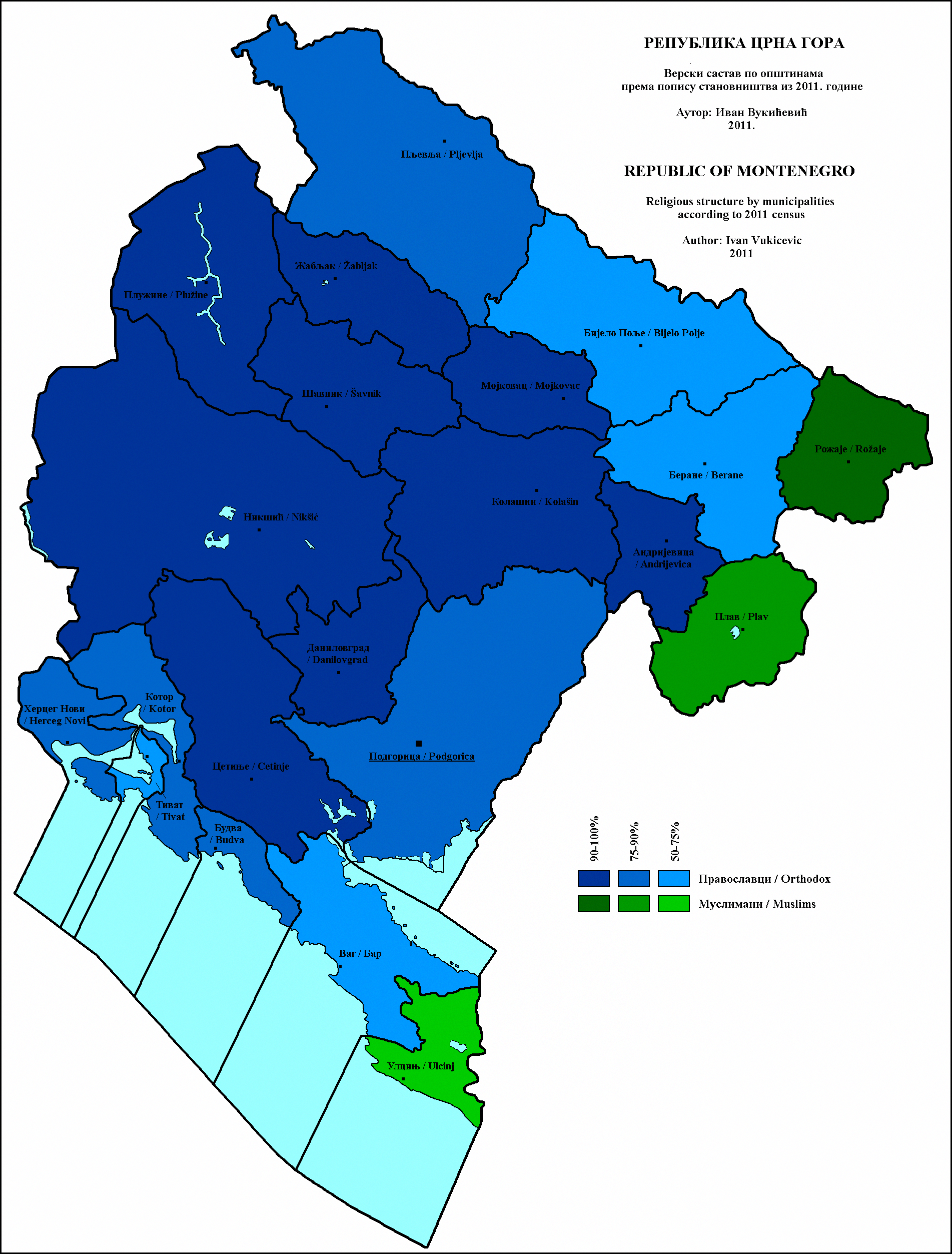
Religious structure of Montenegro by municipalities 2011

Religious structure of Montenegro by municipalities 2011

== 2023 ==
Total: 623,633

=== Ethnic structure ===
- Montenegrins 256,436 (41.12%)
- Serbs 205,370 (32.93%)
- Bosniaks 58,956 (9.45%)
- Albanians 30,978 (4.97%)
- Russians 12,824 (2.06%)
- Ethnic Muslims 10,162 (1.63%)
- Roma 5,629 (0.90%)
- Croats 5,150 (0.83%)
- Others 38,130 (6.11%)

== See also ==
- Demographics of Montenegro
- Montenegrins

== Sources ==
- Montenegrin Census' from 1909 to 2003
- The Ethnic Structure of the Population in Montenegro
- "Petar I Petrovic' - DJELA" publisher CID Podgorica 1999 year, printed by "Vojna tamparija" - Beograd
- "Statistički Godišnjak 2006" - Statistical Office of Montenegro
